= Kubuntu =

Linux distribution based on Ubuntu, utilizing the KDE desktop environment

- Kubuntu 26.10 "Stonking Stingray"
- Developer: Community-driven, previously Blue Systems/Canonical Ltd.
- OS family: Linux (Unix-like)
- Working state: Current
- Source model: Open-source
- Initial release: April 8, 2005; 21 years ago
- Latest release: Regular: 26.10 (Stonking Stingray) / October 15, 2026; 25 days ago LTS: 26.04 (Resolute Raccoon) / April 23, 2026; 6 months ago
- Marketing target: Home computers, business use
- Available in: Multilingual (more than 55)
- Update method: APT or PackageKit
- Package manager: dpkg and Snap
- Supported platforms: x86-64, ARM64
- Kernel type: Monolithic (Linux kernel)
- Userland: GNU
- Default user interface: KDE Plasma Desktop; Plasma Mobile
- License: Free software licenses (mainly GPL)
- Official website: kubuntu.org

Kubuntu (/kʊˈbʊntuː/ kuu-BUUN-too) is an official flavor of Ubuntu, a Linux distribution that uses the KDE Plasma Desktop Environment instead of GNOME. As part of the Ubuntu project, Kubuntu uses the same underlying systems. Kubuntu shares the same repositories as Ubuntu and is released regularly on the same schedule as Ubuntu.

Kubuntu was sponsored by Canonical Ltd. until 2012, and then directly by Blue Systems. Now, employees of Blue Systems contribute upstream to KDE and Debian, and Kubuntu development is led by community contributors. During the changeover, Kubuntu retained the use of Ubuntu project servers and existing developers.

== Name ==
"Kubuntu" is a registered trademark held by Canonical. It is derived from the name Ubuntu, prefixing a K to represent the KDE platform that Kubuntu is built upon (following a widespread naming convention of prefixing K to the name of any software released for use on KDE platforms), as well as the KDE community.

Ubuntu is a Bantu term translating roughly to 'humanity'. Since Bantu grammar involves prefixes to form noun classes, and the prefix ku- has the meaning 'toward' in Bemba, kubuntu is therefore also a meaningful Bemba word or phrase translating to 'toward humanity'. Reportedly, the same word, by coincidence, also takes the meaning of 'free' (in the sense of 'without payment') in Kirundi.

== Comparison with Ubuntu ==
Kubuntu typically differs from Ubuntu in graphical applications and tools:

Software	Ubuntu	Kubuntu
Kernel and core	Linux kernel and Ubuntu core	
Display server	Wayland	
Sound server	PipeWire	
Multimedia	GNOME Videos and Rhythmbox	Haruna and Elisa
Window manager	Mutter	KWin
Desktop environment	GNOME	Plasma Desktop
Primary toolkit	GTK	Qt
Browser	Firefox	
Office suite	LibreOffice	
Email and PIM	Thunderbird	

== History ==
Development started in December 2004 at the Ubuntu Mataró Conference in Mataró, Spain when a Canonical employee Andreas Mueller, from Gnoppix, had the idea to make an Ubuntu KDE variant and got the approval from Mark Shuttleworth to start the first Ubuntu variant, called Kubuntu. On the same evening Chris Halls from the OpenOffice.org project and Jonathan Riddell from KDE started volunteering on the newborn project.

Shortly after Ubuntu was started, Mark Shuttleworth stated in an interview that he recognized the need for the KDE-based distribution in order to maintain diversity in Linux distributions, which in his belief aligns with Ubuntu project's overall purpose of increasing the adoption of free software.

K Desktop Environment 3 was used as default interface until Kubuntu 8.04. That version included KDE Plasma Desktop as unsupported option which became default in the subsequent release, 8.10.

On February 6, 2012, Canonical employee Jonathan Riddell announced the end of Canonical's Kubuntu sponsorship. On April 10, 2012, Blue Systems was announced on the Kubuntu website as the new sponsor. As a result, both developers employed by Canonical to work on Kubuntu–Jonathan Riddell and Aurélien Gâteau–transferred to Blue Systems.

Since 2019, Kubuntu has partnered with MindShare Inc. to offer "Kubuntu Focus" laptops and mini-PCs optimized and supported specifically for the LTS releases.

== Releases ==
Kubuntu follows the same naming/versioning system as Ubuntu, with each release having a code name and a version number (based on the year and month of release). Canonical provides support and security updates for Kubuntu components that are shared with Ubuntu for 18 months – five years in the case of long-term support (LTS) versions – after release. Both a desktop version and an alternative (installation) version (for the x86 and AMD64 platforms) are available. Kubuntu CDs were also available through the ShipIt service (which was discontinued as of April 2011).

Version	Release date	Code name	Supported until	Linux kernel	KDE Plasma	Qt	Notes
5.04	2005-04-08	Hoary Hedgehog	2006-10-31	2.6.10	—N/a		Initial release including KDE 3.4 and a selection of the most useful KDE programs. Some of these are not in the official KDE itself, including Amarok, Kaffeine, Gwenview, and K3b. Inclusion of update-manager/upgrade-notifier; Kickstart compatibility.
5.10	2005-10-13	Breezy Badger	2007-04-13	2.6.12	—N/a		KDE 3.4.3 and the Guidance configuration tools. It also comes with the Adept Package Manager, the first to make use of debtags for easier searching (replacing the Kynaptic package manager used in the previous release); System Settings, a re-organised kcontrol-like centre and KDE Bluetooth; Graphical boot process with progress bar (Usplash); OEM Installer Support; Launchpad tracking; GCC 4.0.
6.06 LTS	2006-06-01	Dapper Drake	2009-06	2.6.15	—N/a		Long Term Support (LTS) release; Live CD and Installer on one disc; Ubiquity installer; Adept Notifier and Simplified Installer; X Display Configuration from Guidance; Better Asian language support; Avahi networking software.
6.10	2006-10-26	Edgy Eft	2008-04	2.6.17	—N/a		KDE 3.5.5. This release adds the photo management application digiKam and accessibility profiles–benefiting people with disabilities. System Settings is also redesigned, and power management, laptop button support & networking are improved. Also features automated problem reports and Upstart.
7.04	2007-04-19	Feisty Fawn	2008-10	2.6.20	—N/a		KDE 3.5.6; Migration assistant; KVM; Easy codec/restricted drivers installation; System Settings restructured into General and Advanced categories; Improved Hewlett-Packard printer management; KNetworkManager included; WPA support; Topic-based help system; OEM installer update; PowerPC support officially dropped.
7.10	2007-10-18	Gutsy Gibbon	2009-04-18	2.6.22	—N/a		New background art. Ships with Strigi and Dolphin by default. Qt port of GDebi graphical installer for package files. Includes Restricted Drivers Manager for the first time. New kubuntu-restricted-extras package is available for download from the repositories.
8.04	2008-04-24	Hardy Heron	2009-10	2.6.24	—N/a		It has two versions: KDE 3.5 and KDE 4.0 (With community support only). This version intends to provide feature parity with GNOME-based Ubuntu. This includes a port of system-config-printer to Qt to enable printer auto-detection, easy video codec installation in Kaffeine, a simple Compiz setup tool and inclusion of Bulletproof X in KDM, and automatic grabbing and releasing of the mouse cursor when running on a VMware virtual machine. Unlike its Ubuntu counterpart, which is a long-term support release, Kubuntu 8.04 is not.
8.10	2008-10-30	Intrepid Ibex	2010-04-30	2.6.27	—N/a		KDE 4.1.2 desktop environment by default, Linux 2.6.27, Xserver 1.5, Adept Manager 3, KNetworkManager 0.7, KWin desktop effects by default, various Kubuntu tool integration.
9.04	2009-04-23	Jaunty Jackalope	2010-10	2.6.28	—N/a		KDE 4.2.2 desktop environment by default, kernel 2.6.28, Xserver 1.6, Adept superseded by KPackageKit, implementation of the ext4 filesystem, faster boot time, addition of community-supported PowerPC images
9.10	2009-10-30	Karmic Koala	2011-04-28	2.6.31	—N/a		KDE 4.3.2 desktop environment by default, GRUB 2, init system moved to Upstart, kernel 2.6.31
10.04 LTS	2010-04-29	Lucid Lynx	2013-05-09	2.6.32	—N/a		Long Term Support (LTS) release. Security updates will be available for three years for desktops and five years for servers. KDE 4.4.2 desktop environment by default, kernel 2.6.32, KPackageKit 0.5.4, Firefox KDE integration, touchpad configuration module by default.
10.10	2010-10-10	Maverick Meerkat	2012-04	2.6.35	—N/a		KDE Software Compilation 4.5. Faster login. Default browser changed to rekonq. New Bluetooth stack. PulseAudio inclusion. Updated KPackageKit with categories. Global menu for netbook. Updated Installer. Combining of the Desktop and Netbook Editions (autodetection).
11.04	2011-04-28	Natty Narwhal	2012-10-28	2.6.38	—N/a		KDE SC 4.6, GStreamer multimedia backend for Phonon, GTK Oxygen theme, games in the default install, UDisks and UPower replace HAL.
11.10	2011-10-12	Oneiric Ocelot	2013-05-09	3.0.3	—N/a		KDE SC 4.7, replacing KPackageKit with Muon Software Centre, Kubuntu low fat setting, OpenGL ES Powered Desktop Effects, KDE-PIM 4.7.2
12.04 LTS	2012-04-25	Precise Pangolin	2017-04-28	3.2.0	—N/a		The third Kubuntu LTS release. KDE SC 4.8
12.10	2012-10-18	Quantal Quetzal	2014-04	3.5.5	—N/a		LibreOffice 3.6.2.2, rekonq 1.1, KDE SC 4.9.2
13.04	2013-04-25	Raring Ringtail	2014-01	3.8.0	—N/a		KDE SC 4.10, Muon Suite 2, LibreOffice 4, Optional Homerun launcher, out-of-the-box MTP support
13.10	2013-10-17	Saucy Salamander	2014-07-17	3.11	—N/a		KDE SC 4.11.2, LibreOffice 4.1.2 rc3
14.04 LTS	2014-04-17	Trusty Tahr	2019-04-25	3.13	—N/a		KDE SC 4.13.0, LibreOffice 4.2.3.3. Default browser changed back to Firefox.
14.10	2014-10-23	Utopic Unicorn	2015-07-23	3.16	—N/a		KDE SC 4.14, KDE Plasma 5 as technical preview.
15.04	2015-04-23	Vivid Vervet	2015-12	3.19	5.2.2	—N/a	KDE Plasma 5.2.2 is now the default desktop environment. Adaptation to systemd and to SDDM. Behind-the-scenes work on the change to Wayland.
15.10	2015-10-22	Wily Werewolf	2016-07-22	4.2	5.4	—N/a	Firefox 41.0, LibreOffice 5.0.
16.04 LTS	2016-04-21	Xenial Xerus	2019-04-21	4.4	5.5.5	—N/a	Firefox 45, LibreOffice 5.1
16.10	2016-10-13	Yakkety Yak	2017-07-20	4.8	5.7.5	—N/a	KDE Applications 16.04.3, KDE Frameworks 5.26.0, LibreOffice 5.2, Firefox 49
17.04	2017-04-13	Zesty Zapus	2018-01-11	4.10	5.9	—N/a	KDE Applications 16.12.3, KDE Frameworks 5.31, LibreOffice 5.3, Firefox 52
17.10	2017-10-19	Artful Aardvark	2018-07-19	4.13	5.10	—N/a	KDE Applications 17.04.3, KDE Frameworks 5.38, LibreOffice 5.4.1, Firefox 56, Cantata replaces Amarok as audio player, VLC media player replaces Dragon Player as media player
18.04 LTS	2018-04-26	Bionic Beaver	2021-05-01	4.15	5.12 LTS	—N/a	LibreOffice 6.0 and Firefox 59; double-click is now default to open files; file indexing default changed to "basic" only (not file content).
18.10	2018-10-18	Cosmic Cuttlefish	2019-07-18	4.18	5.13	—N/a	KDE Applications 18.04.3, KDE Frameworks 5.50, LibreOffice 6.1.2, Firefox 63; snap integration by default in software centre, Plasma Wayland session-can be installed for testing (but is not supported), fingerprint scanner support, only available in 64-bit ISO images
19.04	2019-04-18	Disco Dingo	2020-01-23	5.0	5.15.4	5.12.2	KDE Applications 18.12.3, KDE Frameworks 5.56, LibreOffice 6.2.2, Firefox 66, KDE Connect 1.3.4, KDevelop 5.3.2, Krita 4.1.7, Latte Dock 0.8.8
19.10	2019-10-17	Eoan Ermine	2020-07-17	5.3	5.16.5	5.12.4	KDE Applications 19.04.3, KDE Frameworks 5.62, LibreOffice 6.3, Firefox 69
20.04 LTS	2020-04-23	Focal Fossa	2023-04-29	5.4	5.18 LTS	5.12.8	KDE Frameworks 5.68.0, LibreOffice 6.4.2.2, Firefox 75
20.10	2020-10-22	Groovy Gorilla	2021-07-22	5.8	5.19.5	5.14.2	KDE Frameworks 5.74.0, LibreOffice 7.0.2, Firefox 82
21.04	2021-04-22	Hirsute Hippo	2022-01-20	5.11	5.21	5.15.2	KDE Frameworks 5.80, LibreOffice 7.1, Firefox 87
21.10	2021-10-14	Impish Indri	2022-07-14	5.13	5.22.5	5.15.2	KDE Gear 21.08, KDE Frameworks 5.86, LibreOffice 7.2, Firefox 92
22.04 LTS	2022-04-21	Jammy Jellyfish	2025-04-24	5.15	5.24 LTS	5.15.3	KDE Gear 21.12.3, KDE Frameworks 5.92, LibreOffice 7.3.2.2, Firefox 99
22.10	2022-10-21	Kinetic Kudu	2023-07-20	5.18	5.25	5.15.5	KDE Gear 22.04.1, LibreOffice 7.4, Firefox 103, KDE Frameworks 5.95
23.04	2023-04-20	Lunar Lobster	2024-01-20	6.2	5.27	5.15.8.	KDE Gear 22.12, LibreOffice 7.5, Firefox 111, KDE Frameworks 5.104
23.10	2023-10-17	Mantic Minotaur	2024-07	6.5	5.27.8	5.15.10	KDE Gear 23.08, LibreOffice 7.6.2.1, Firefox 118
24.04 LTS	2024-04-25	Noble Numbat	2027-04	6.8	5.27.11	5.15.13	KDE Apps updates, including KDE Gear 23.08 and other updated apps Firefox 117 snap is the default browser from the Snap Store. LibreOffice 24.2 is provided by default in the full installation.
24.10	2024-10-10	Oracular Oriole	2025-07	6.11	6.1.5	Qt6 6.6 / Qt5 5.15.13	KDE Frameworks 6.6.0, KDE Gear 24.08 / 24.05 / 23.08, Firefox 131 snap, LibreOffice 24.8 Wayland as default Plasma session
25.04	2025-04-17	Plucky Puffin	2026-01	6.14	6.3	Qt6.8	KDE Frameworks 6.12.0, KDE Gear 24.12.3, Firefox 137 snap, LibreOffice 25.2
25.10	2025-10-09	Questing Quokka	2026-07	6.17	6.4.5	Qt6.9	KDE Frameworks 6.17.0, KDE Gear 25.08, Firefox 143 snap, LibreOffice 25.8 Rust-based Sudo
26.04 LTS	2026-04-23	Resolute Raccoon	2029-04	7.0	6.6	Qt6.10	KDE Frameworks 6.24.0, KDE Gear 25.12.3, Firefox 150 snap, LibreOffice 26.2 Wayland as default and only supported Plasma session
26.10	2026-10-15	Stonking Stingray	2027-07	7.3	6.7	Qt6.11.2	KDE Frameworks 6.29.0, KDE Gear 26.08.1, Firefox 157 snap, LibreOffice 26.8.1
Legend: Old version, not maintained Older version, still maintained Current stable version Future version

== System requirements ==
The desktop version of Kubuntu currently supports the X86-64 architecture. Intel x86 support was discontinued after the 18.04 release and existing 32-bit users were supported until 2023. The recommended minimum system requirements for a desktop installation are as follows:

Requirements	Minimum	Recommended
Processor	64-bit, 2.0 GHz dual-core	64-bit, 2.5 GHz quad-core
Memory	2 GB	8 GB
Hard drive capacity	10 GB	50 GB

== Deployments ==
Kubuntu rollouts include the world's largest Linux desktop deployment, that includes more than 500,000 desktops in Brazil (in 42,000 schools of 4,000 cities).

The software of the 14,800 Linux workstations of Munich was switched to Kubuntu LTS 12.04 and KDE 4.11.

The Taipei City Government decided to replace Windows with a Kubuntu distribution on 10,000 PCs for schools.

The French Parliament announced in 2006 that they would switch over 1,000 workstations to Kubuntu by June 2007.

A Kubuntu distribution, by La Laguna University, is used in more than 3,000 computers spread in several computer labs, laboratories and libraries, among other internal projects in the Canary Islands. Since October 2007, Kubuntu is now used in all of the 1,100 state schools in the Canary Islands.

== Gallery ==
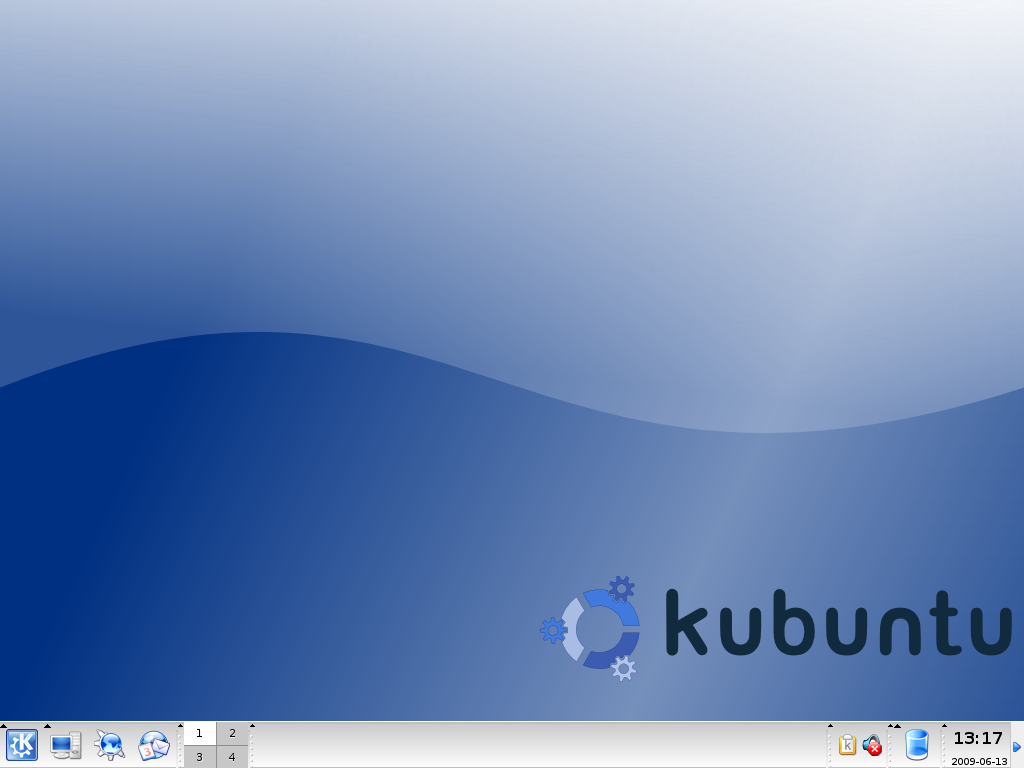
Kubuntu 5.04

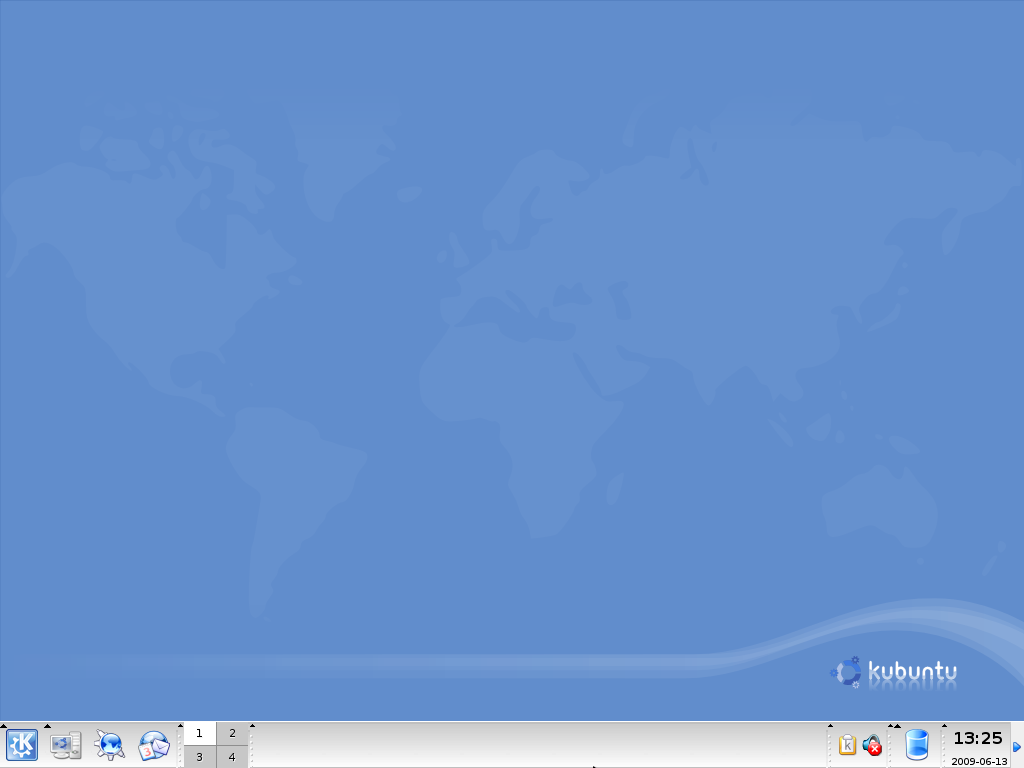
Kubuntu 5.10

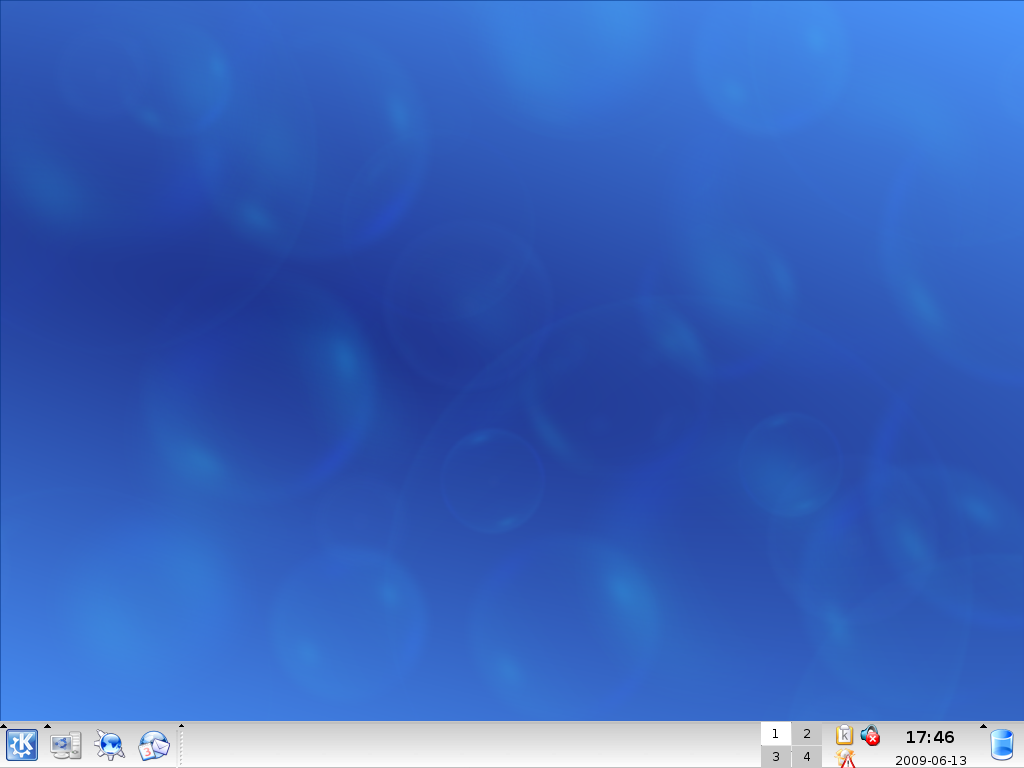
Kubuntu 6.06 LTS

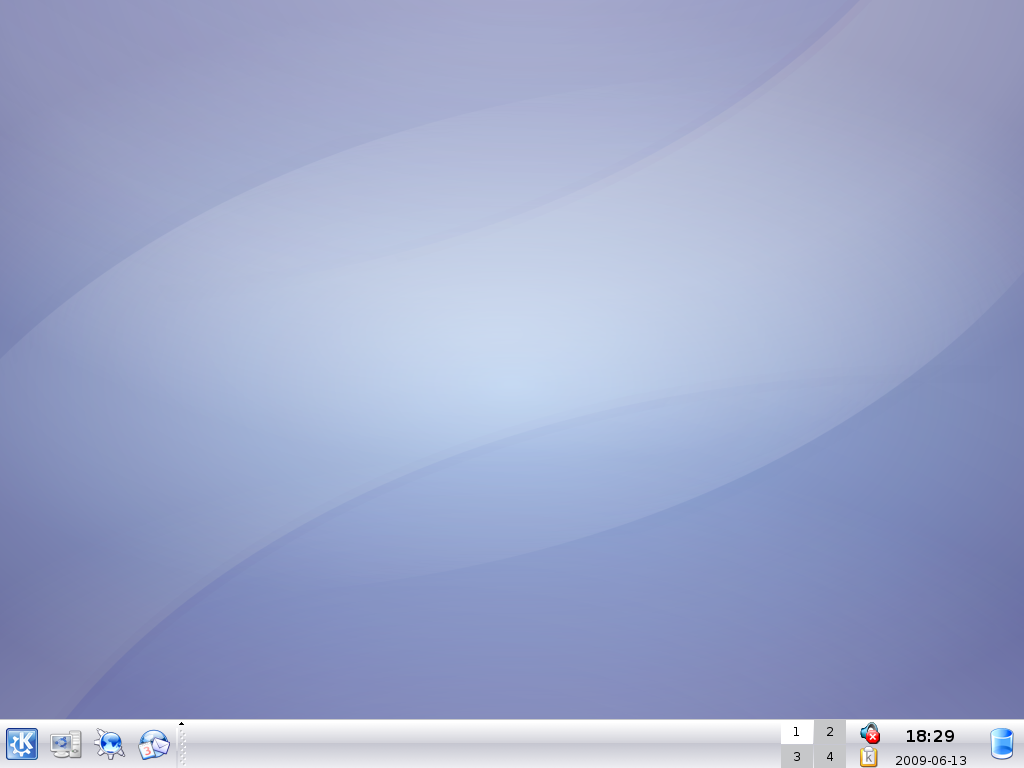
Kubuntu 6.10

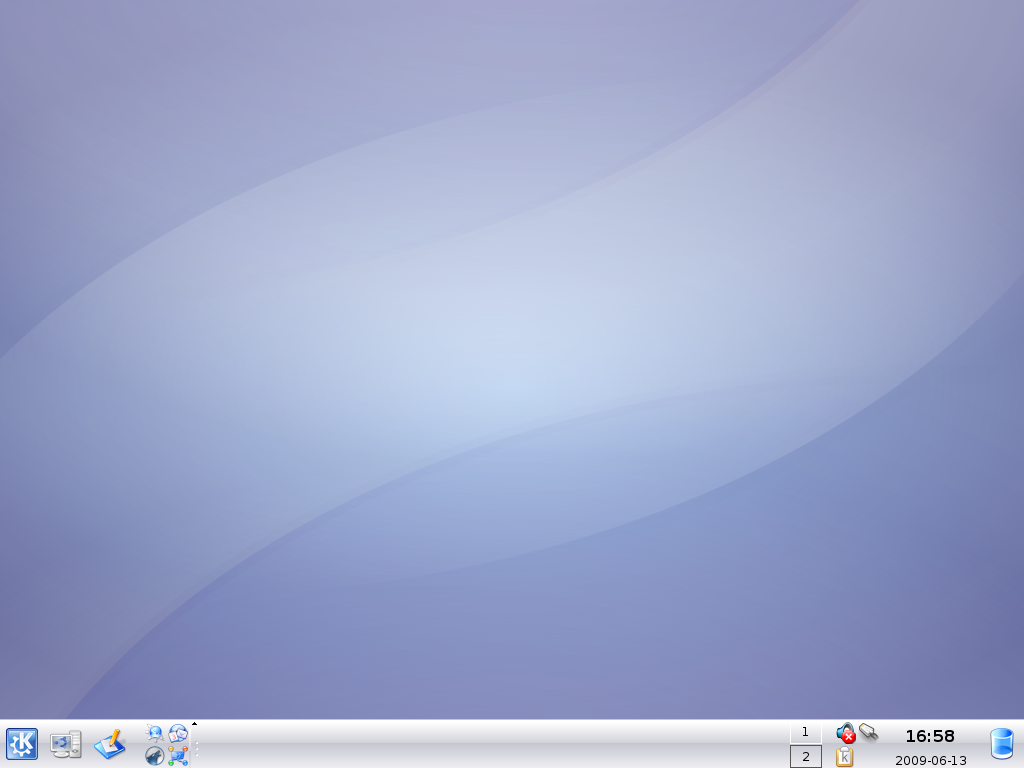
Kubuntu 7.04

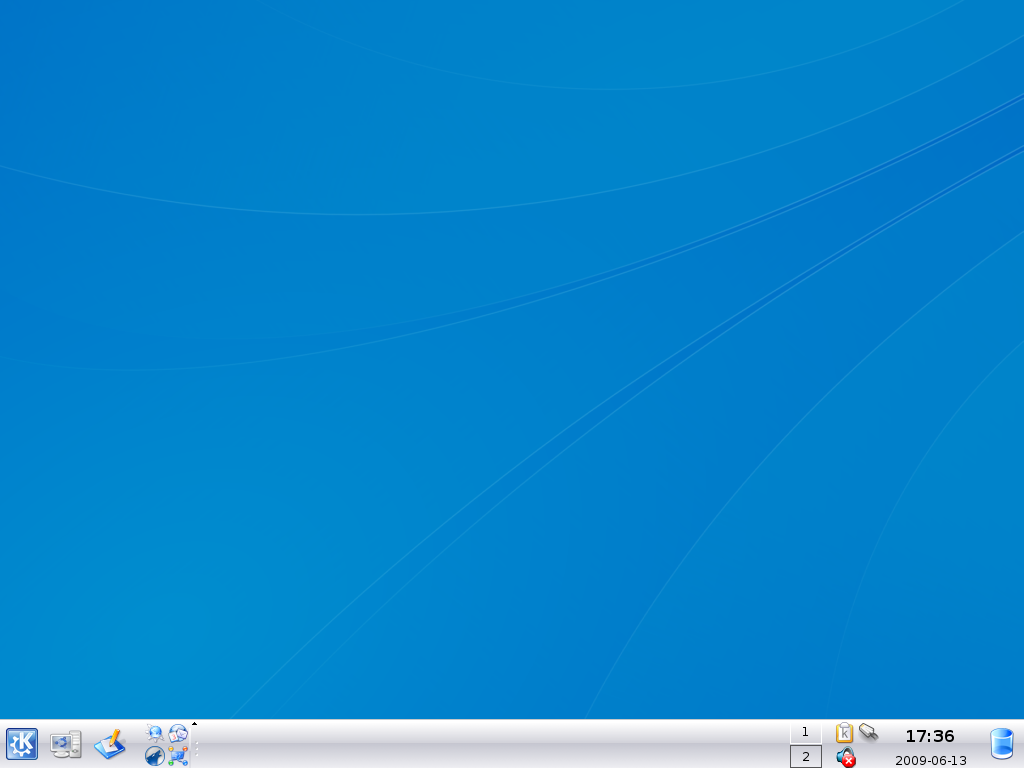
Kubuntu 7.10

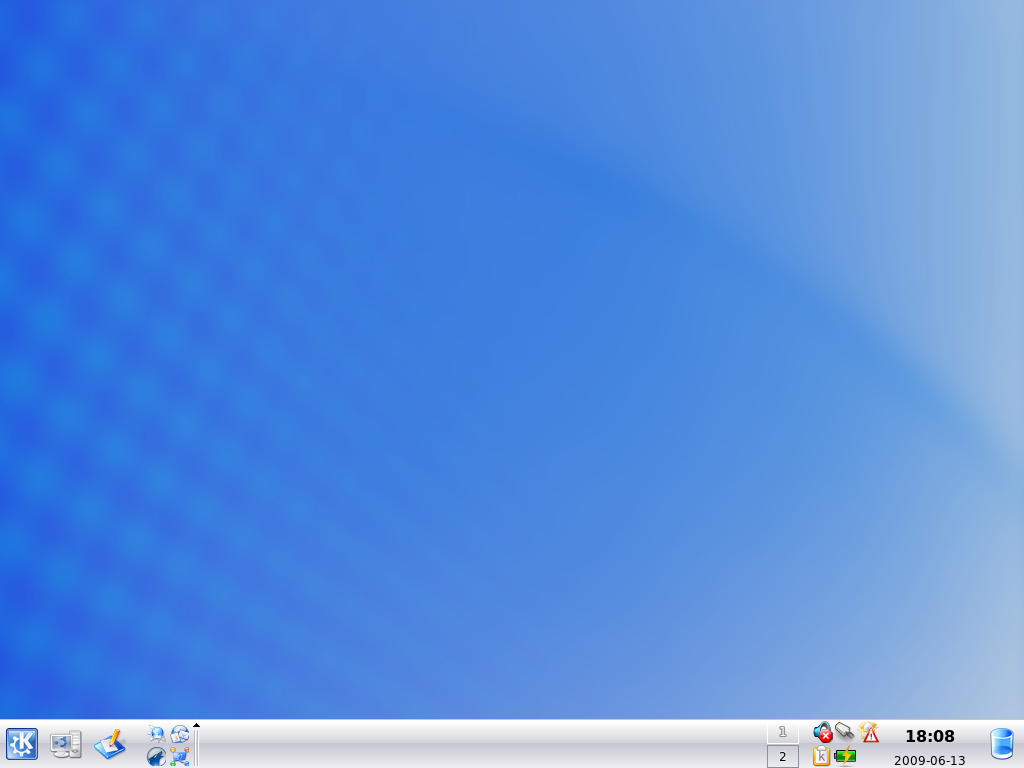
Kubuntu 8.04

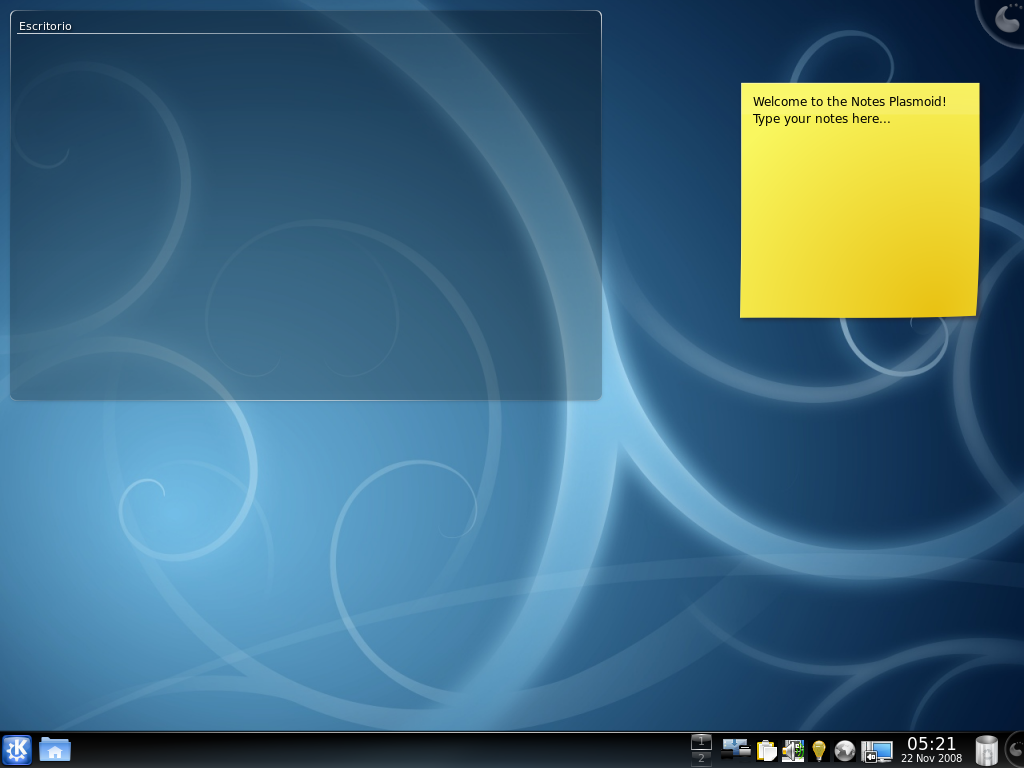
Kubuntu 8.10

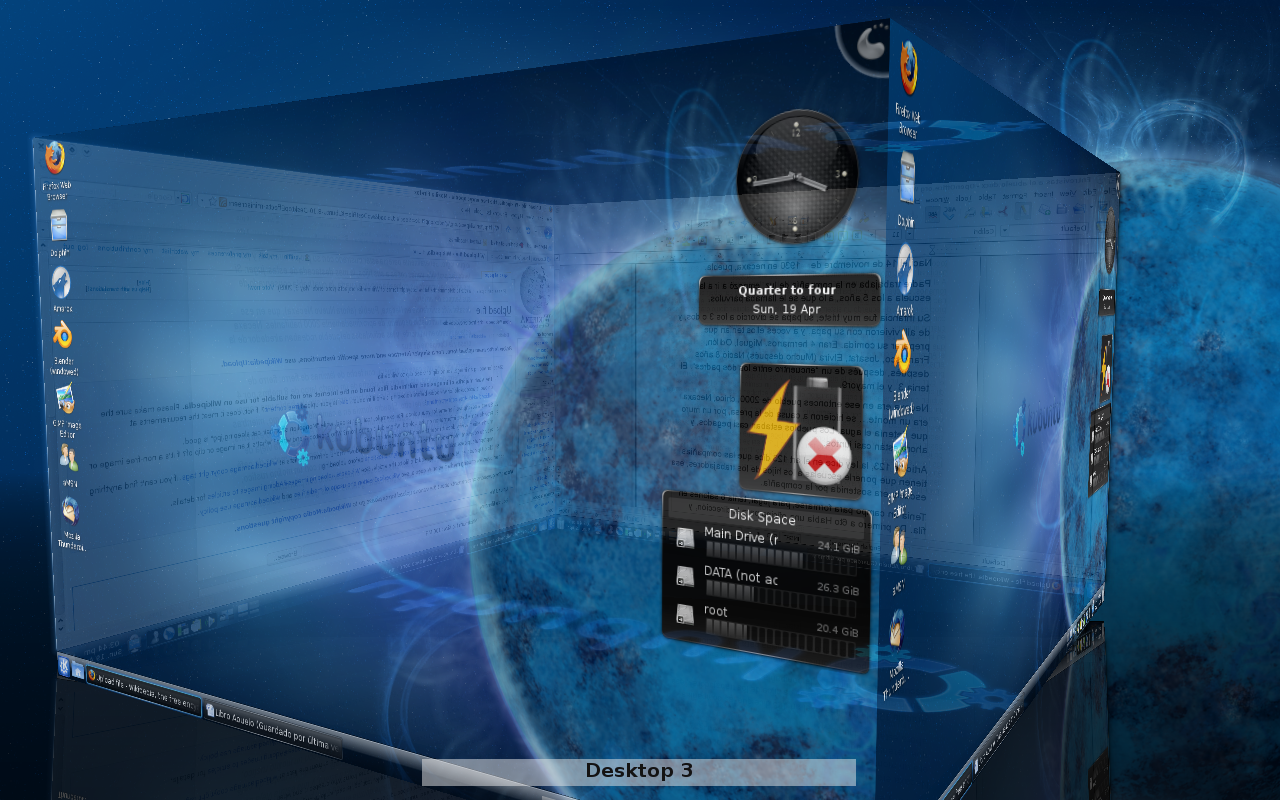
Kubuntu 9.04 showing some of its Desktop Effects

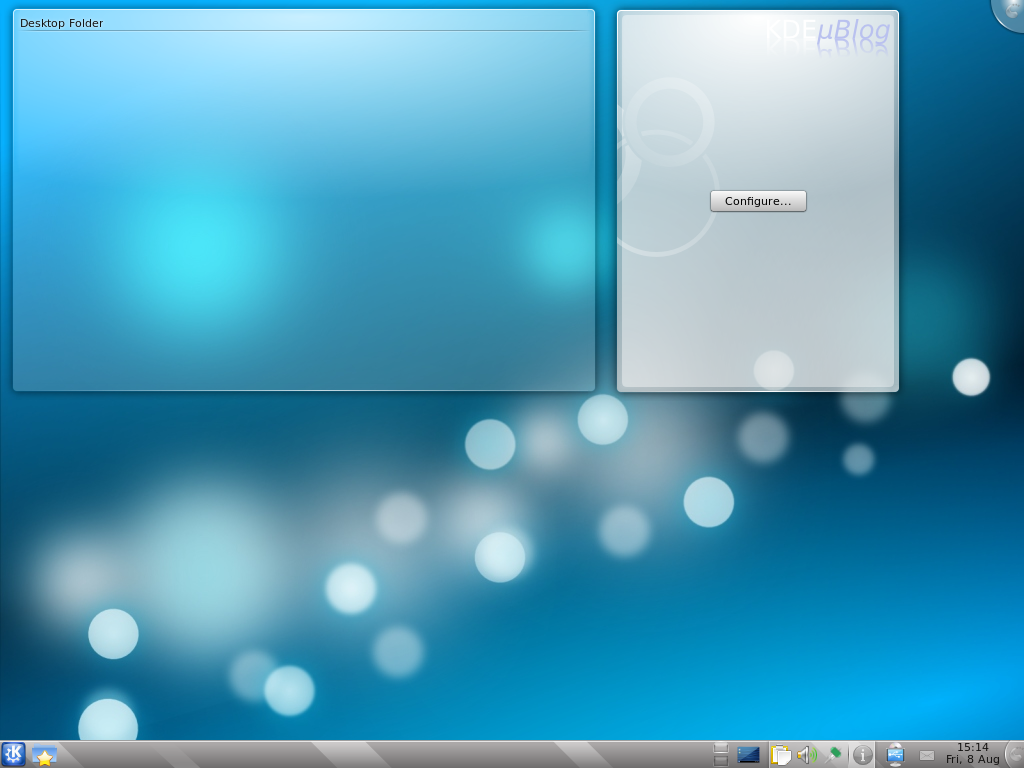
Kubuntu 9.10

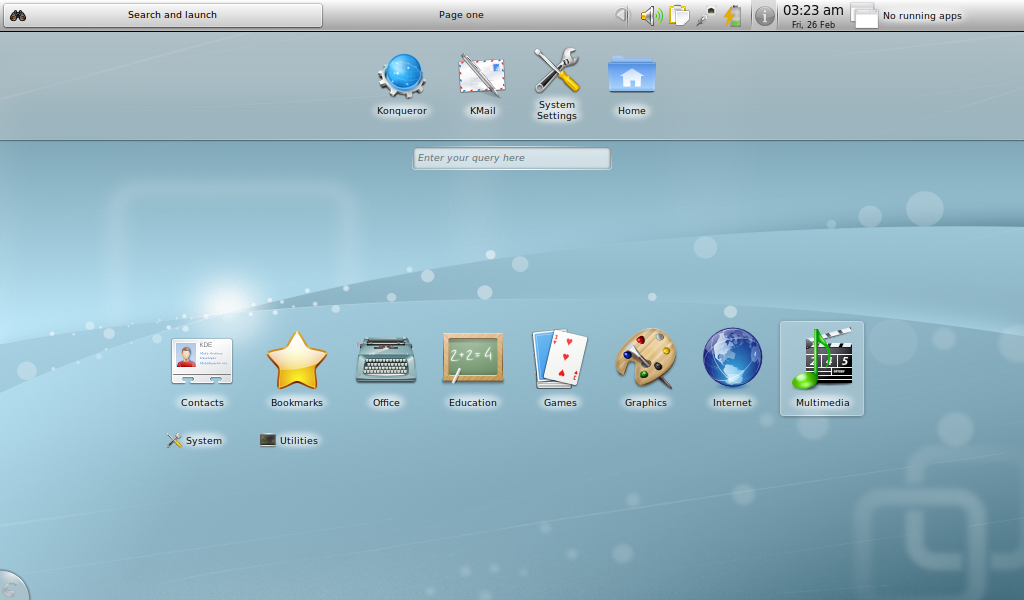
Kubuntu 10.04 LTS Netbook Edition

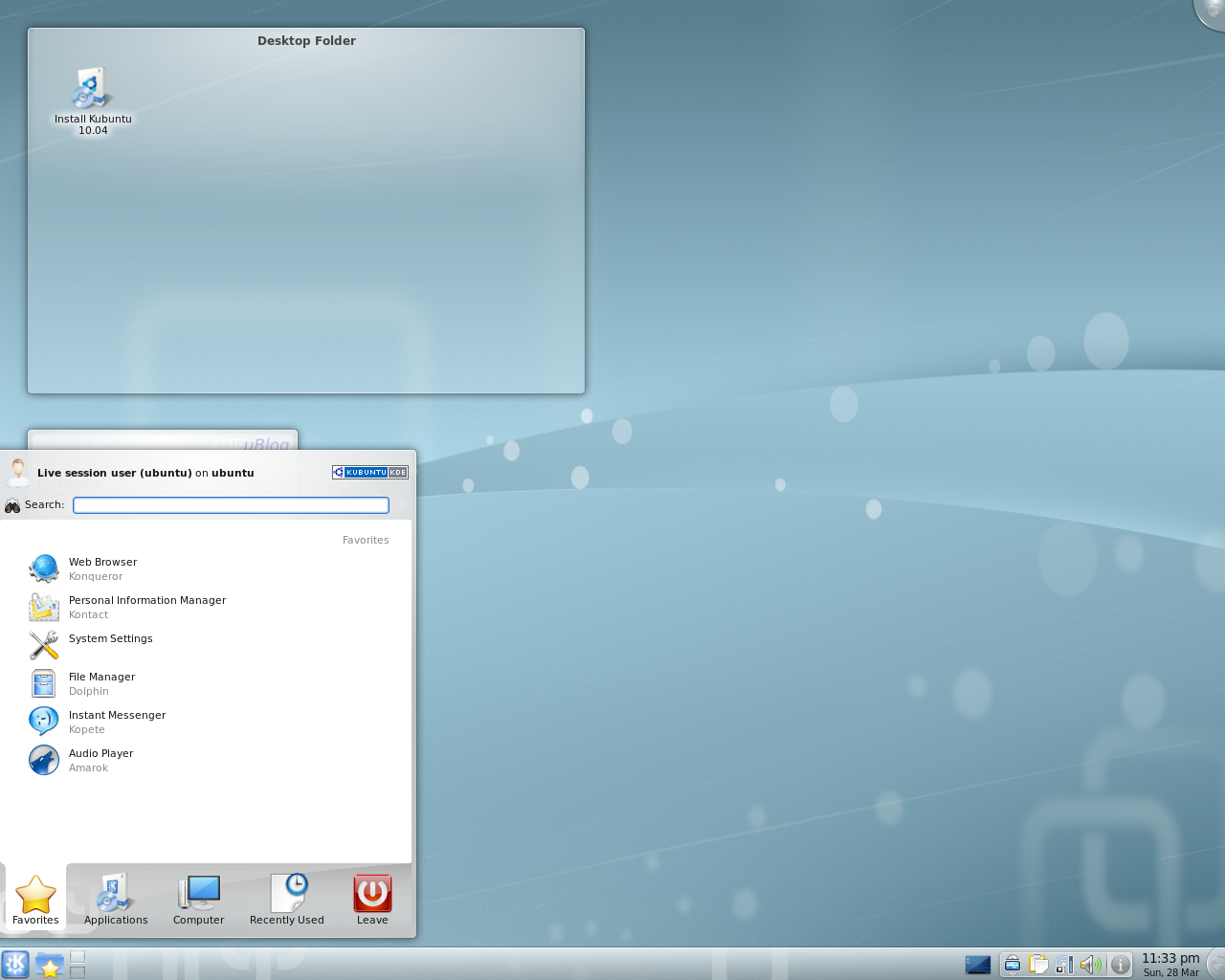
Kubuntu 10.04 LTS Desktop Edition

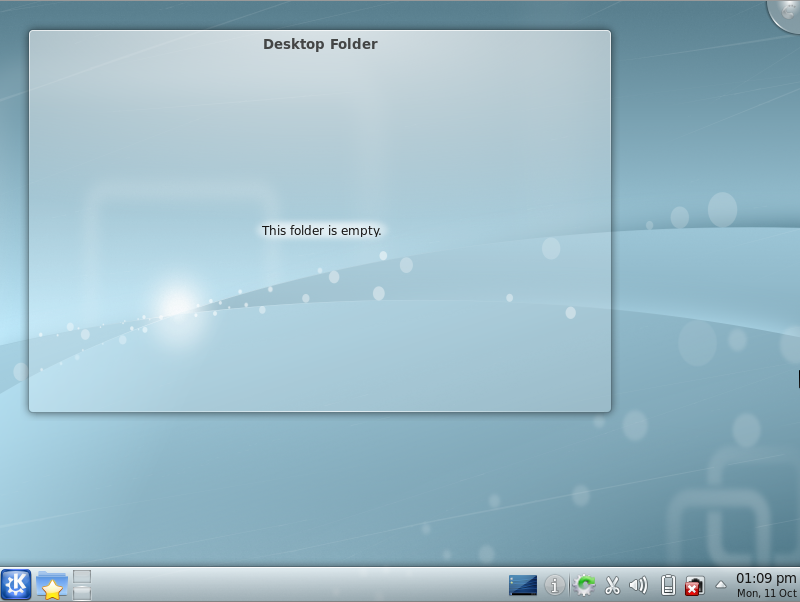
Kubuntu 10.10

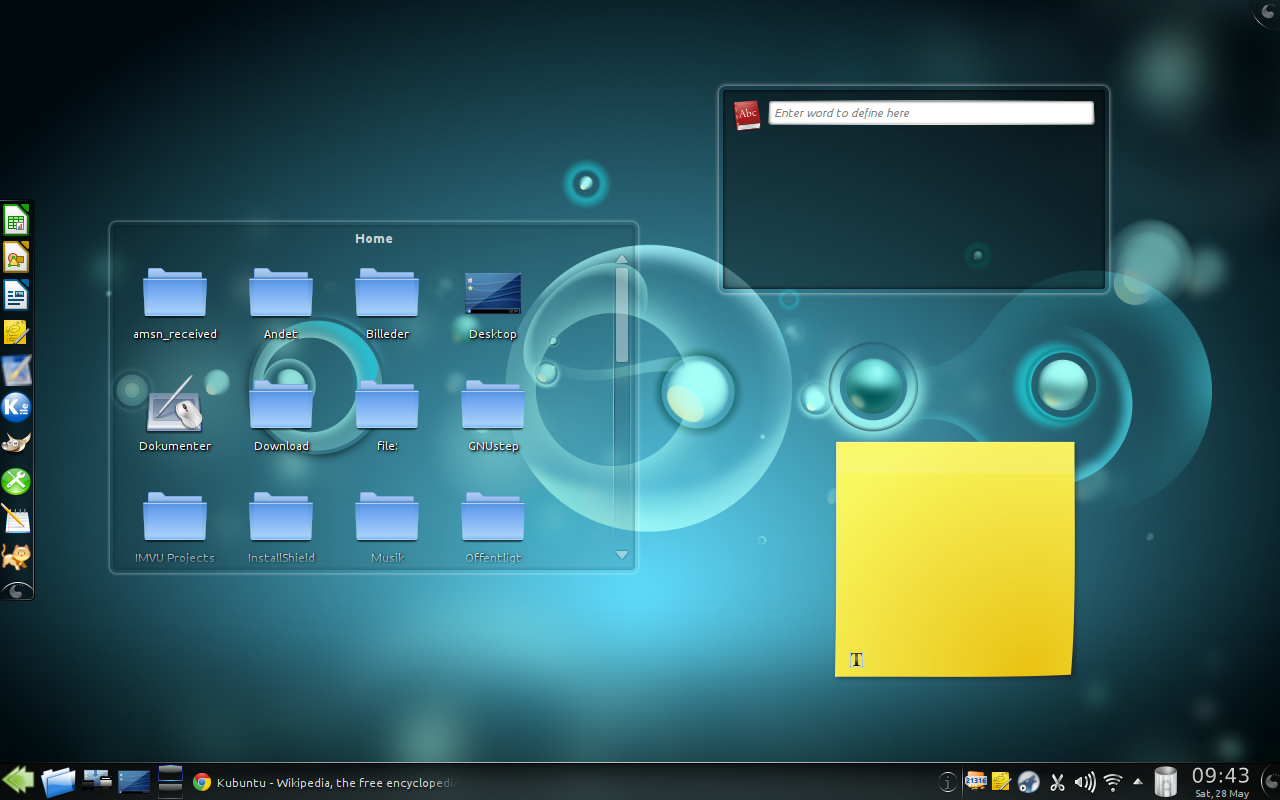
Kubuntu 11.04 Desktop Edition

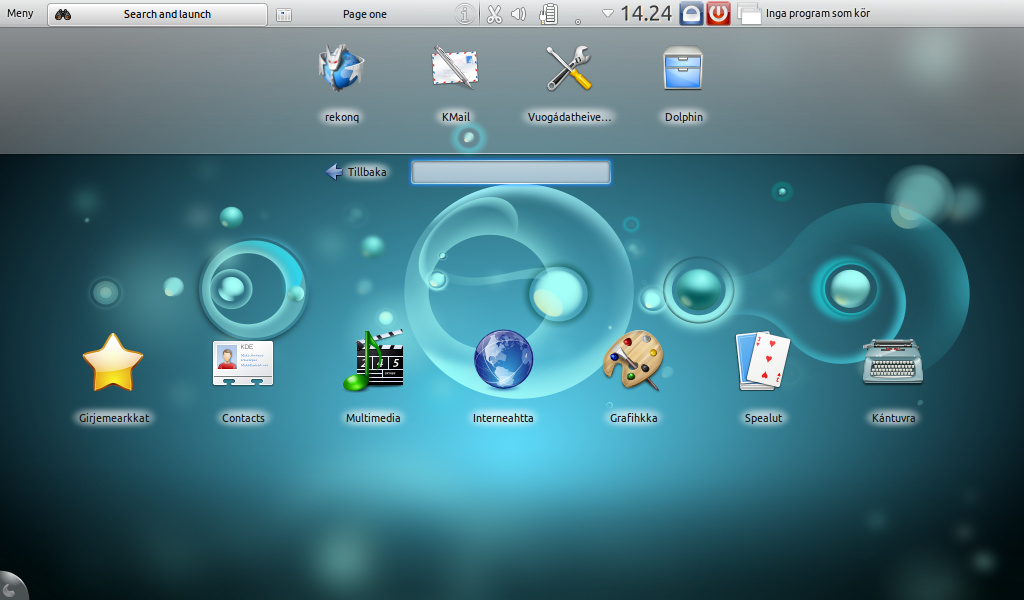
Kubuntu 11.04 Netbook Edition

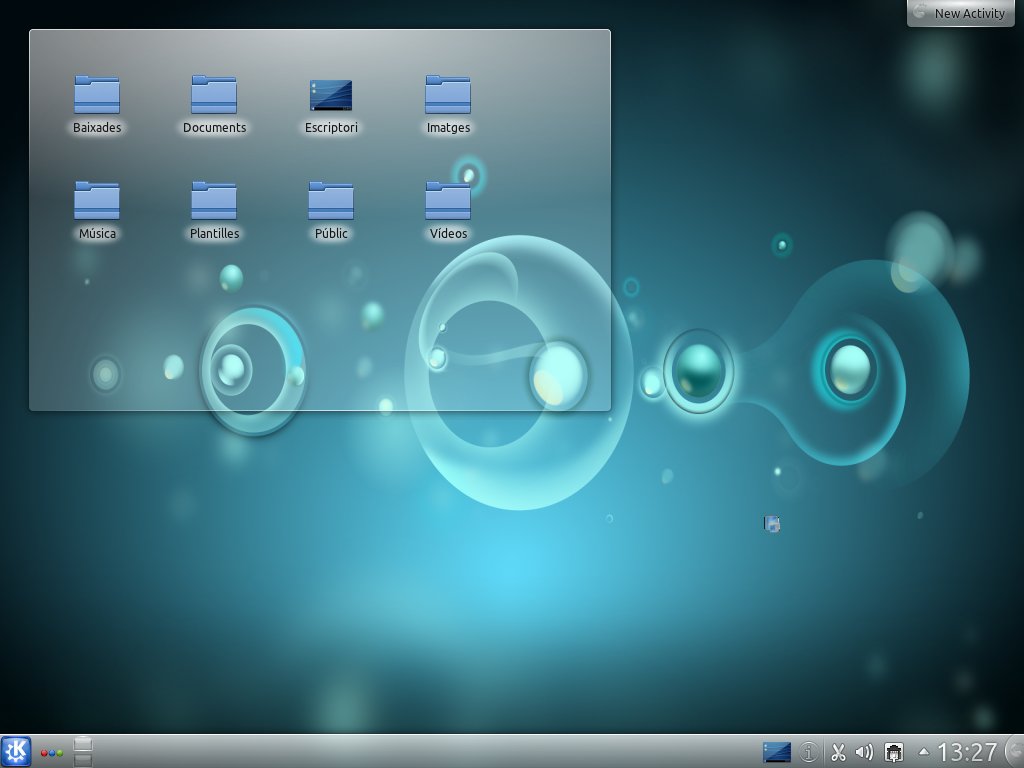
Kubuntu 11.10

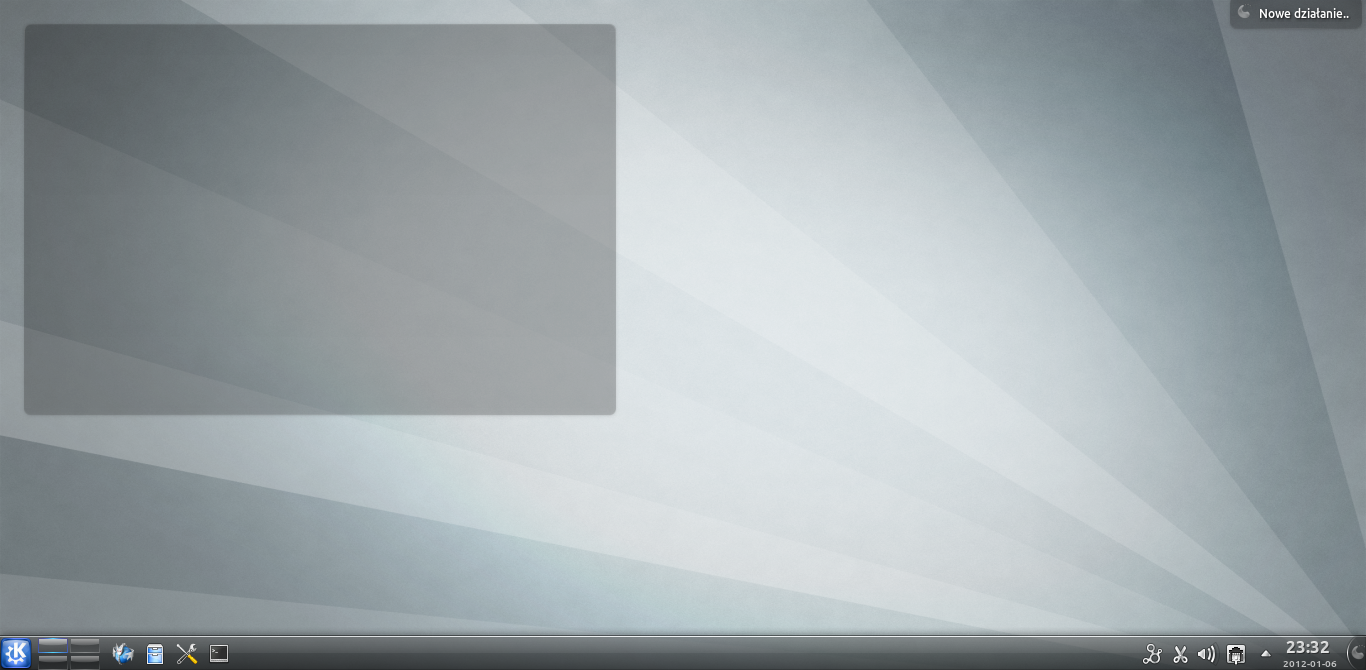
Kubuntu 12.04 LTS Desktop Edition

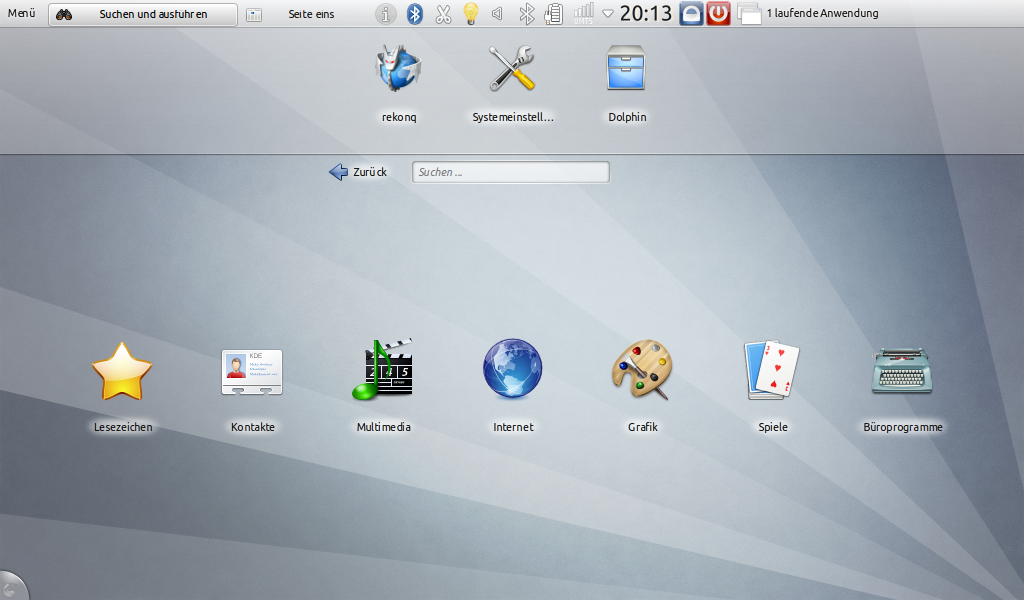
Kubuntu 12.04 LTS Netbook Edition

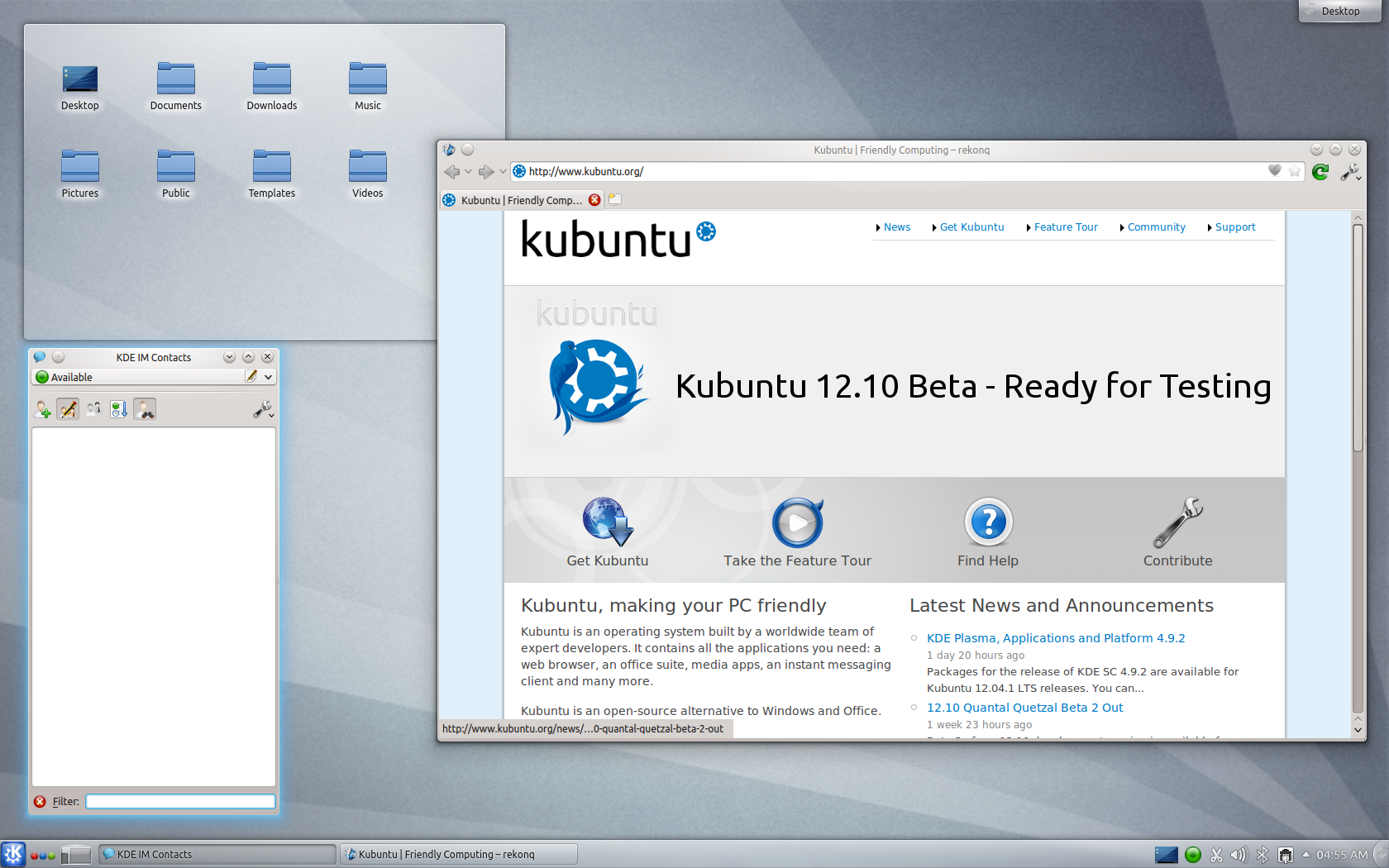
Kubuntu 12.10 Desktop Edition

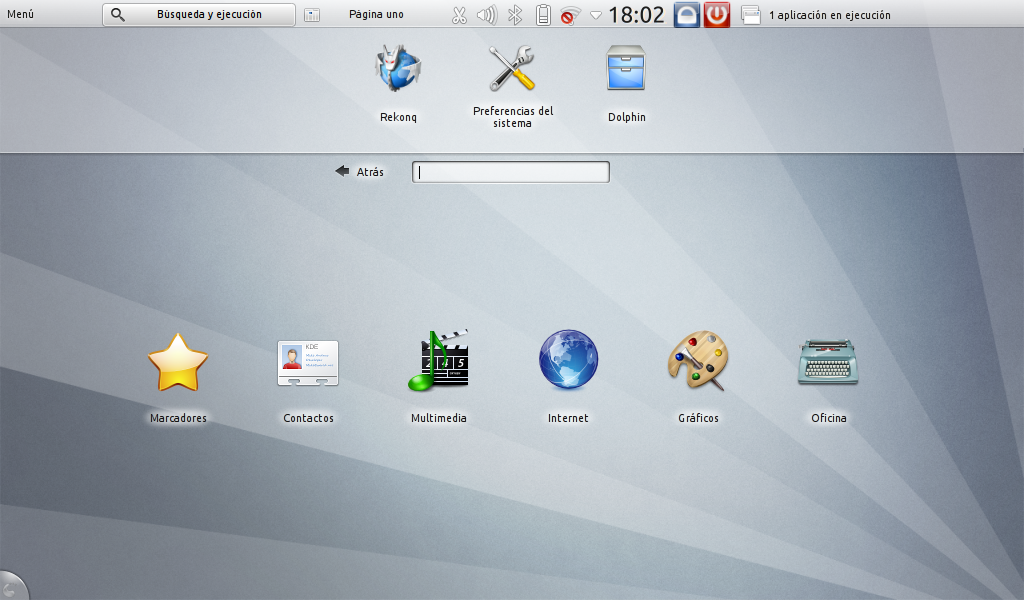
Kubuntu 12.10 Netbook Edition

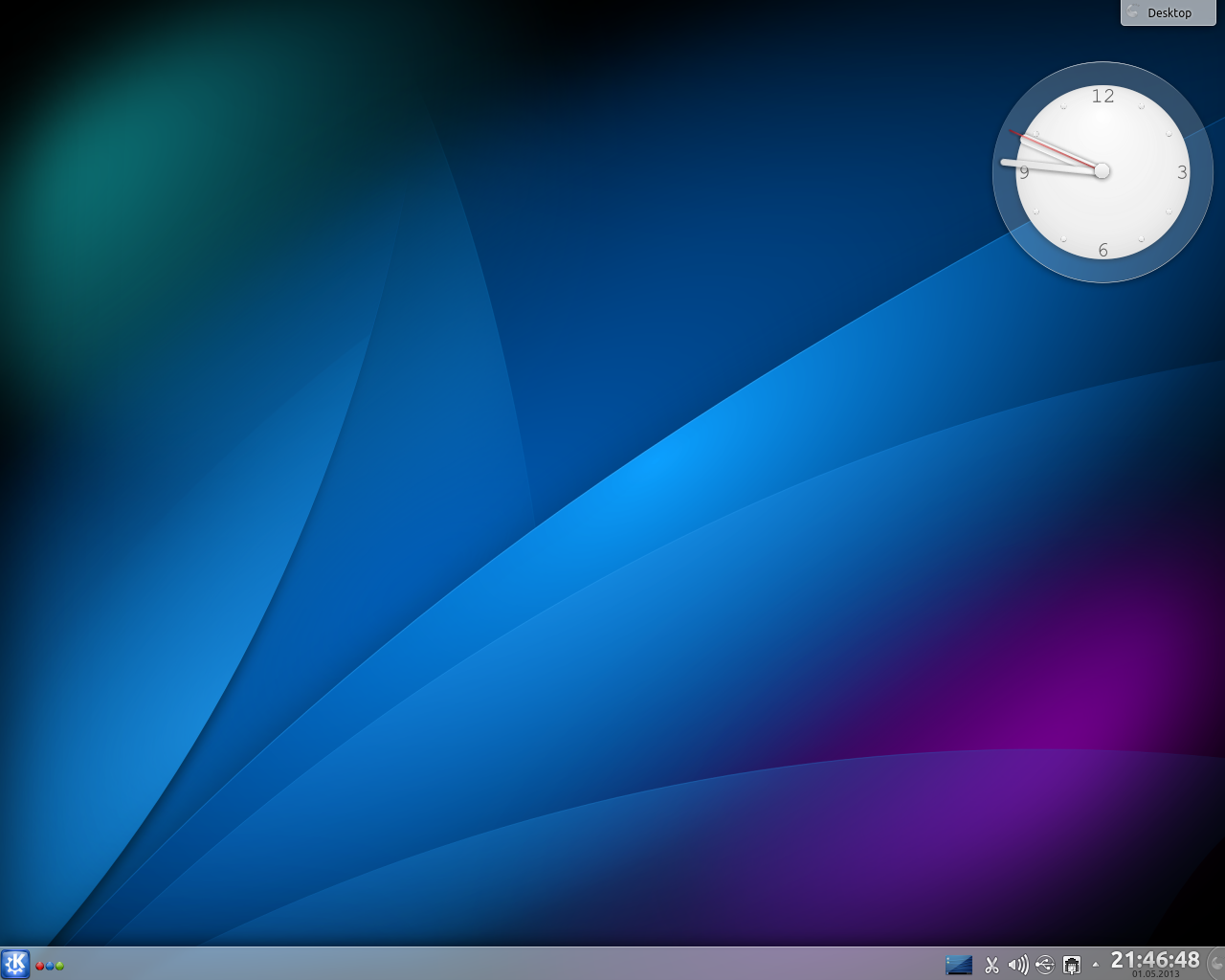
Kubuntu 13.04

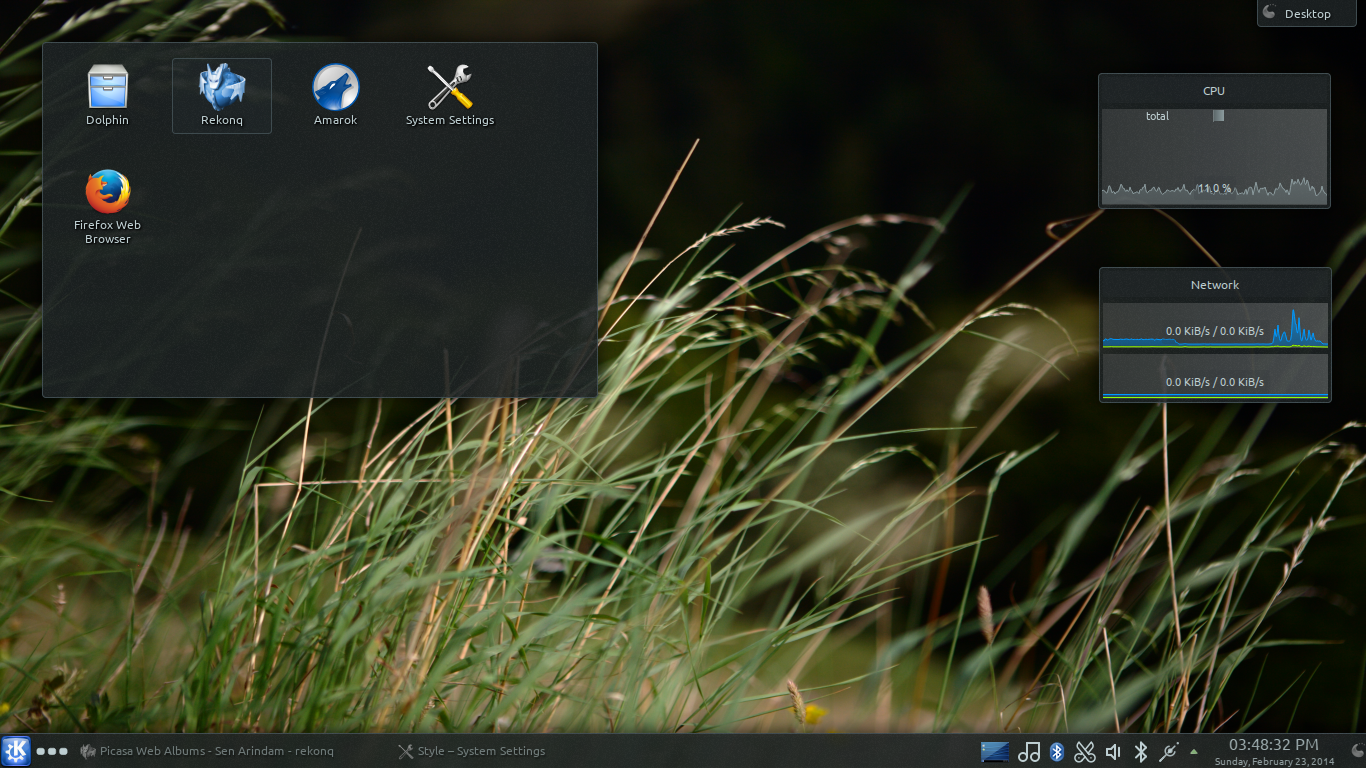
Kubuntu 13.10

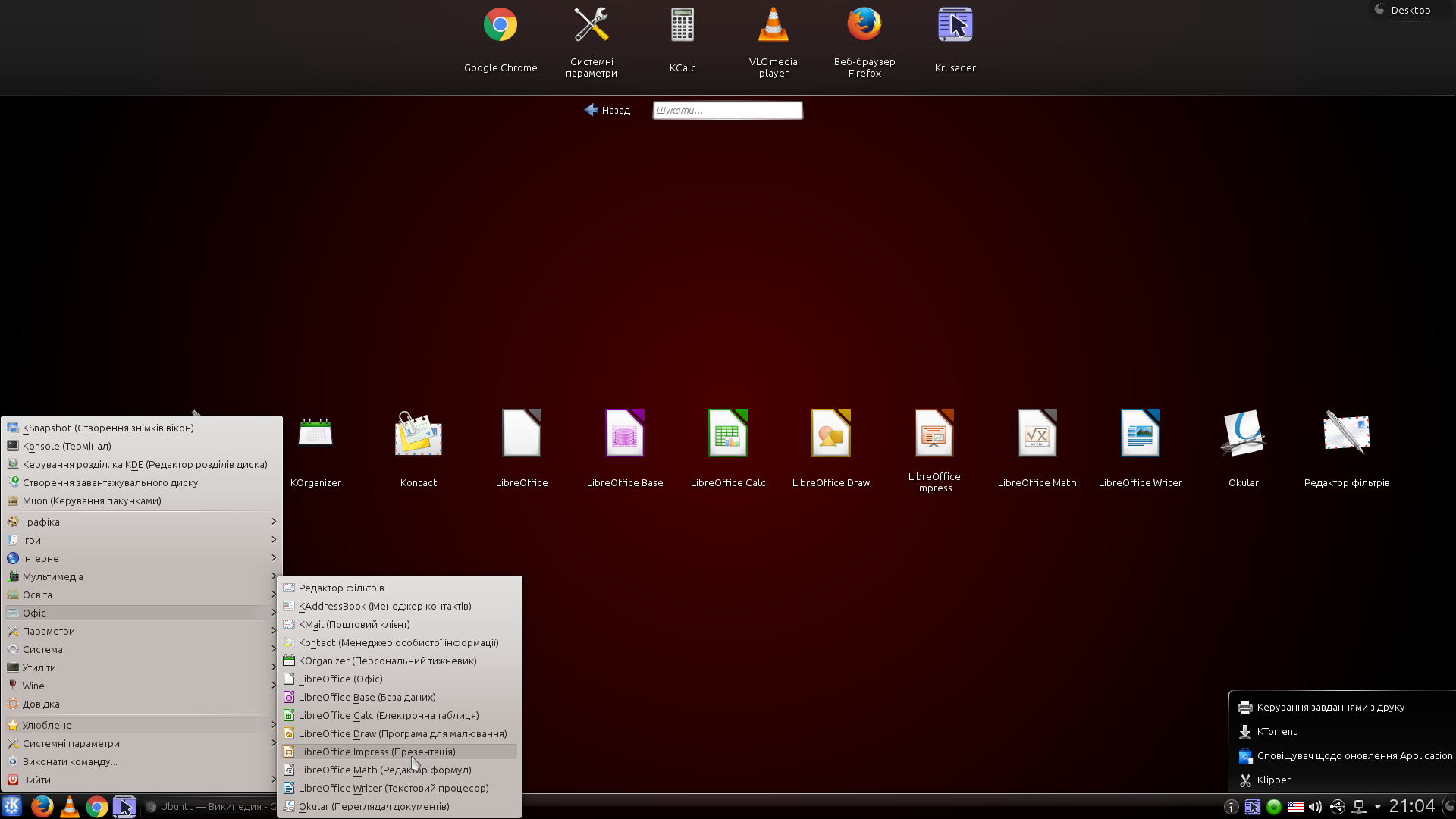
Kubuntu 14.04 LTS

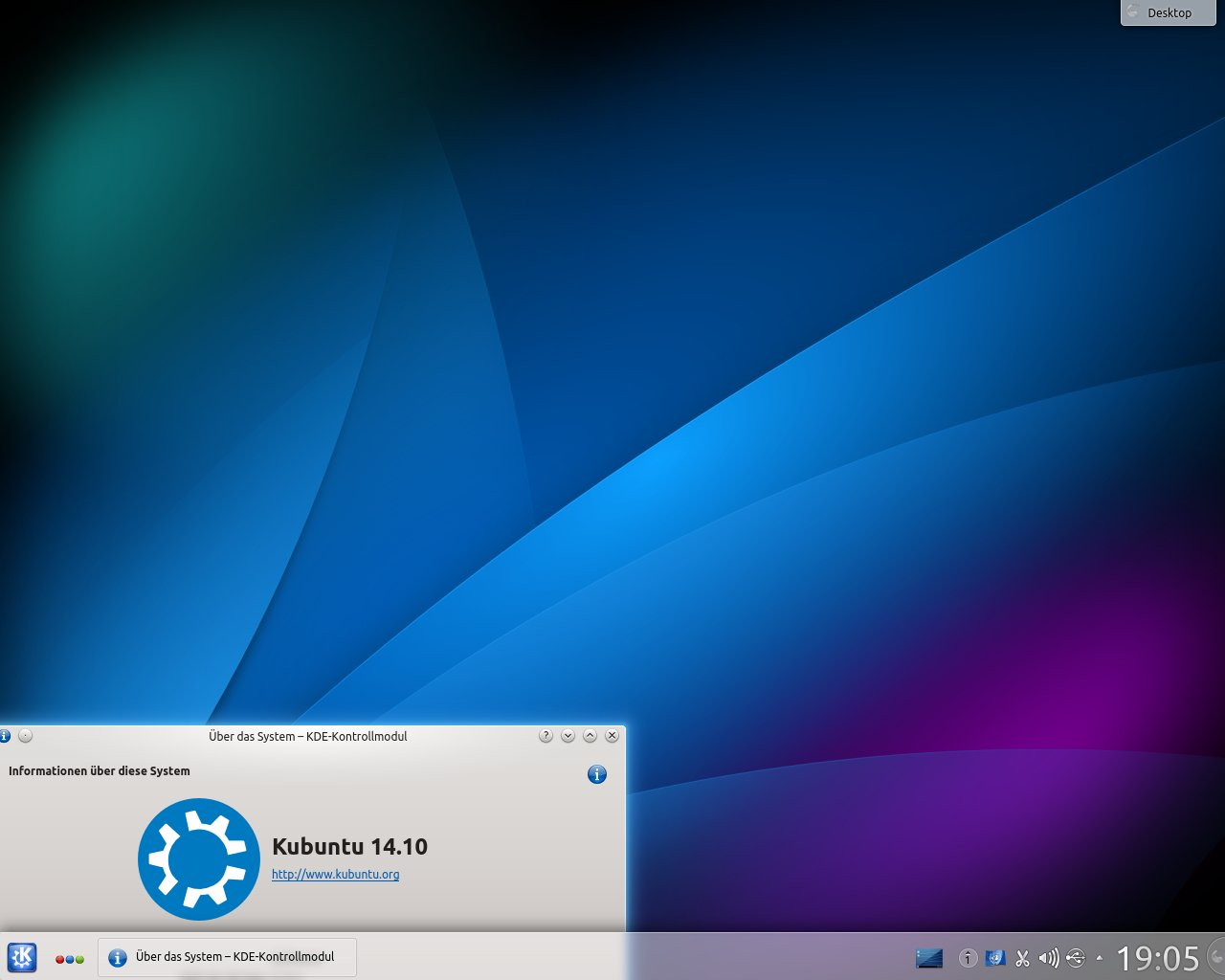
Kubuntu 14.10

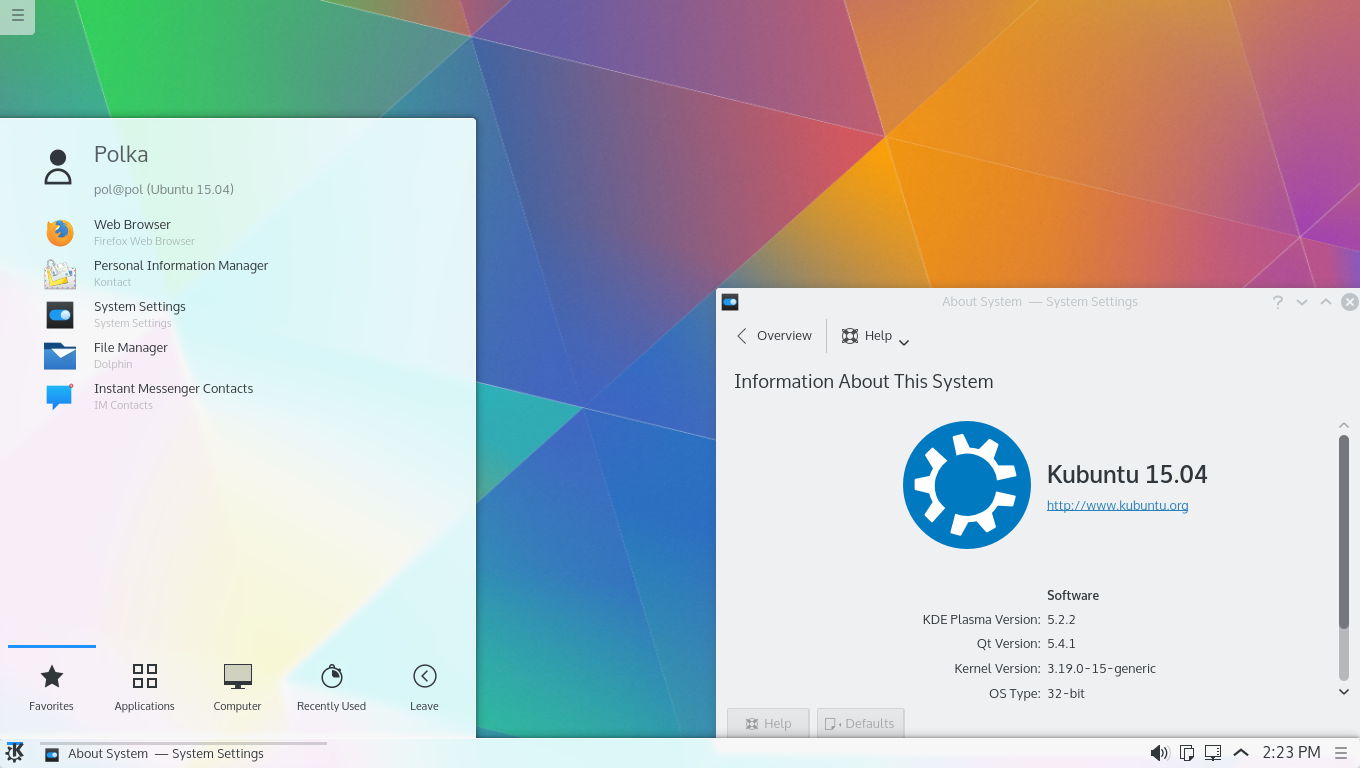
Kubuntu 15.04

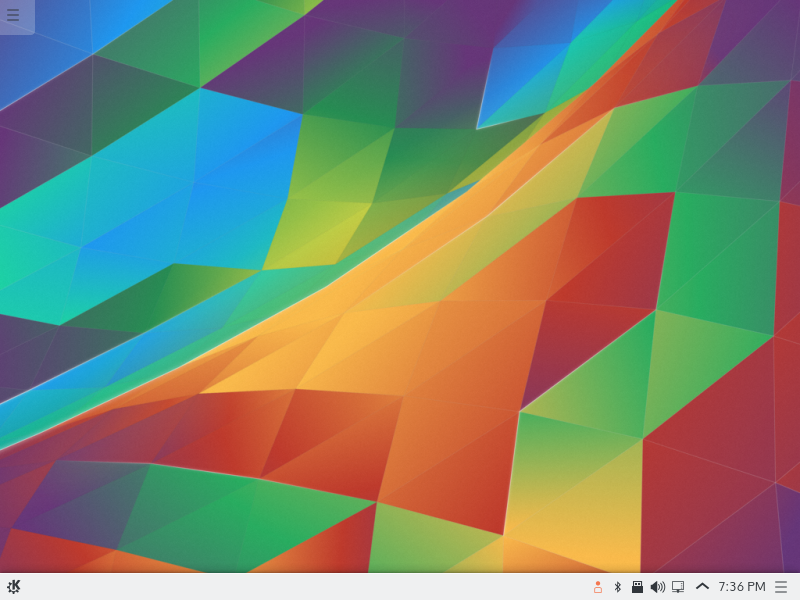
Kubuntu 15.10

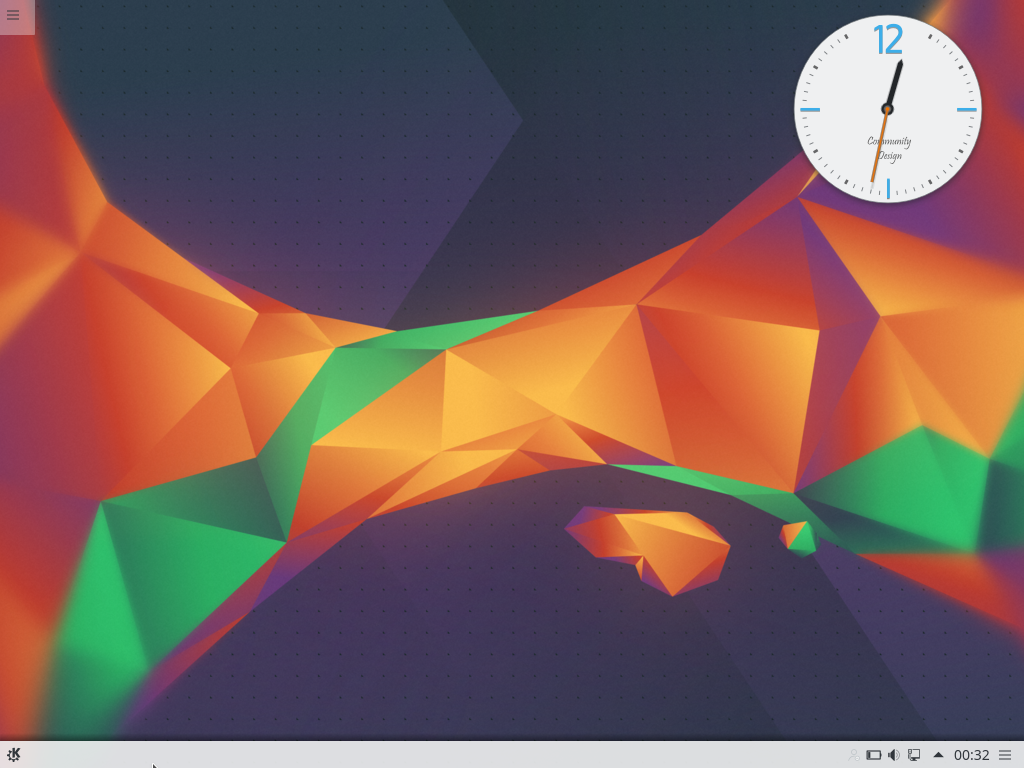
Kubuntu 16.04 LTS (Xenial Xerus)

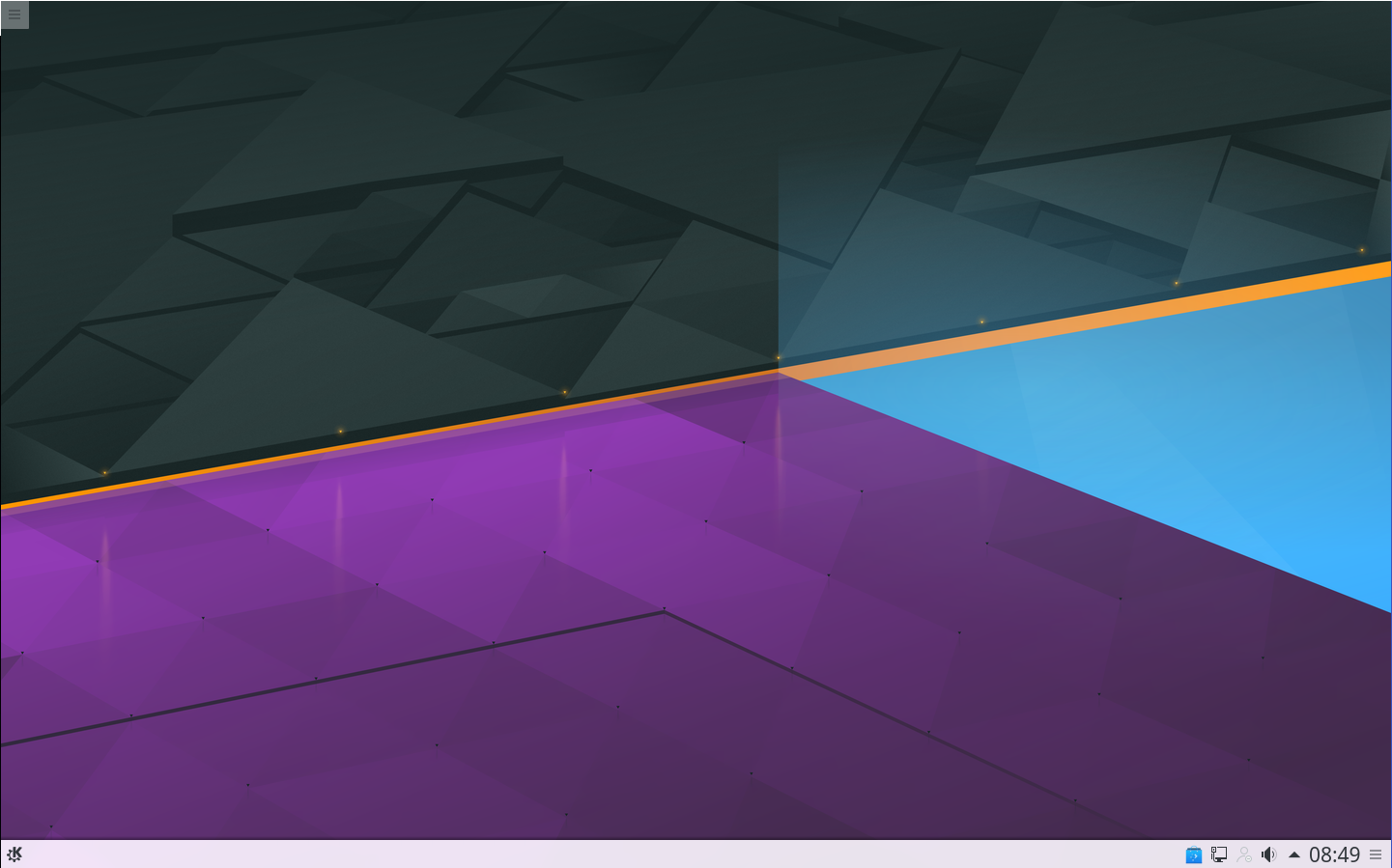
Kubuntu 16.10 (Yakkety Yak)

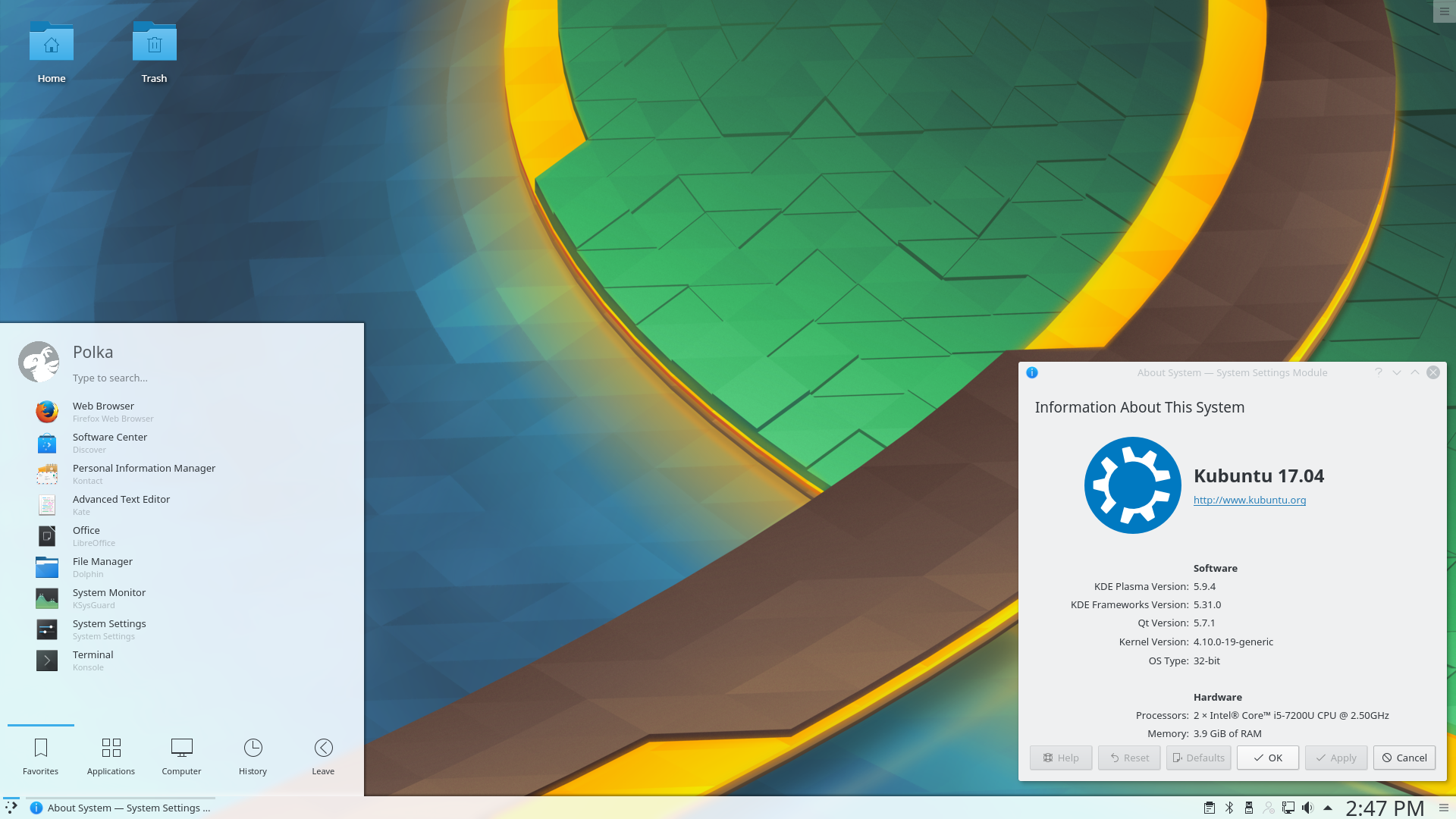
Kubuntu 17.04

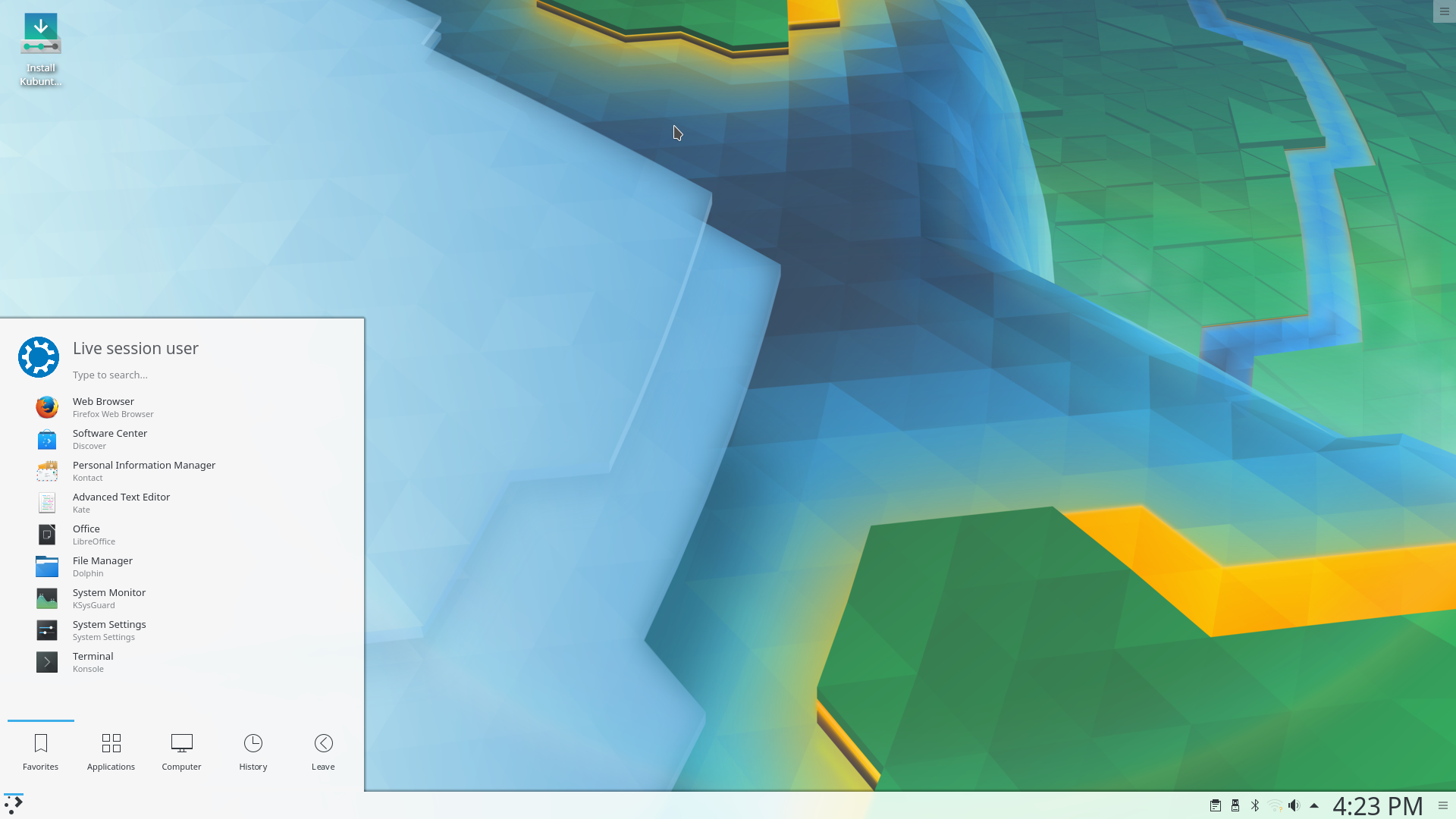
Kubuntu 17.10

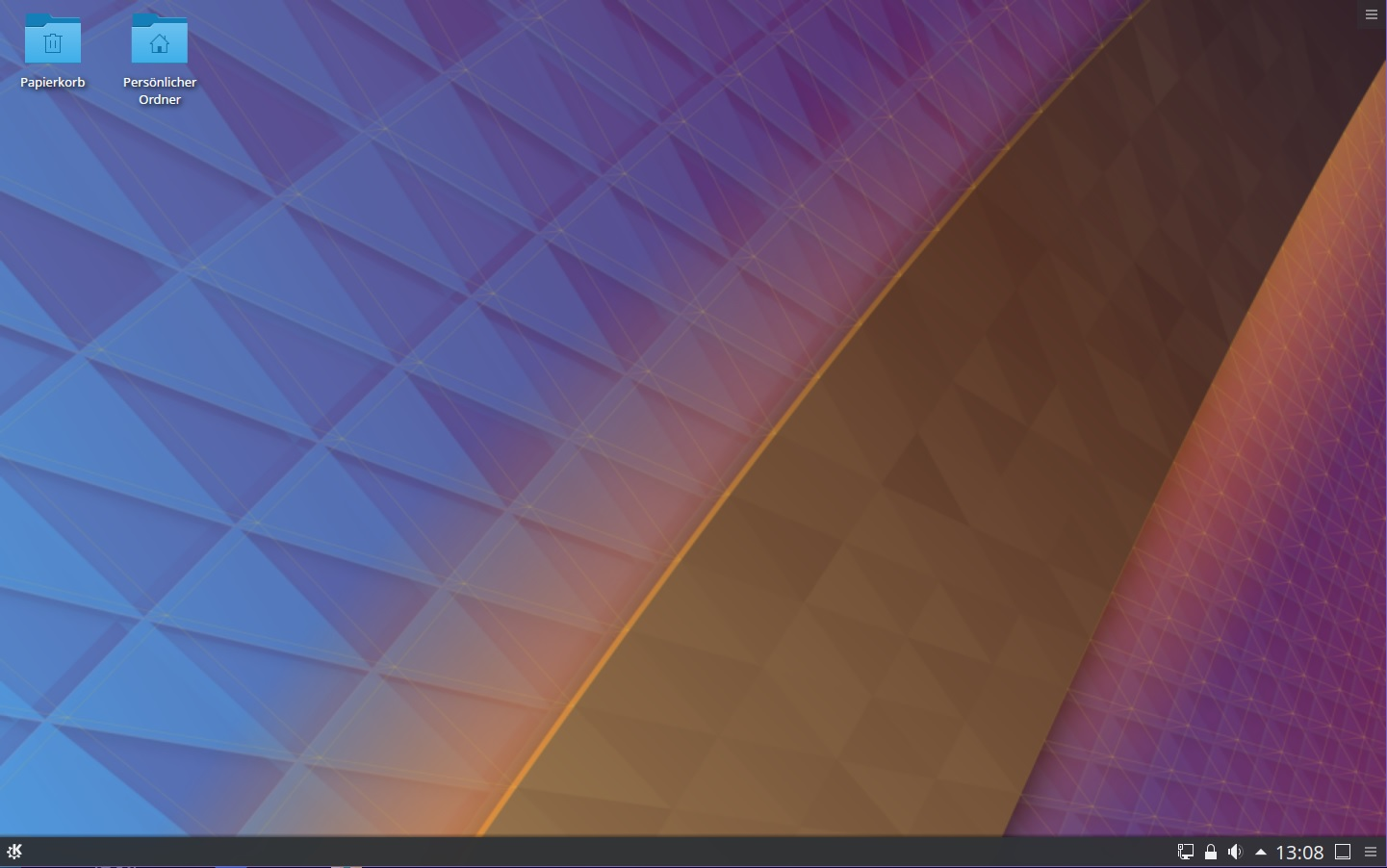
Kubuntu 18.04 LTS

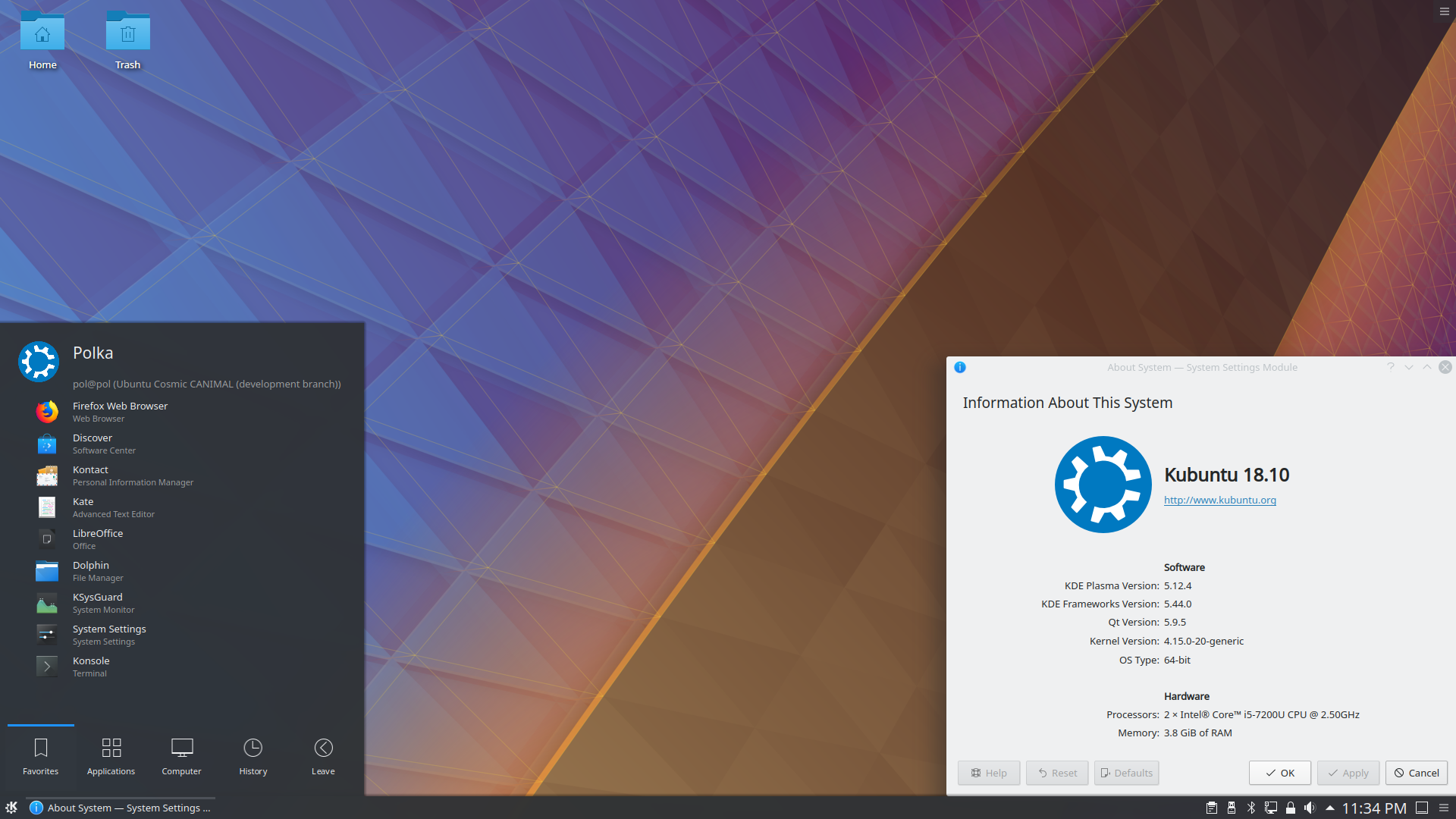
Kubuntu 18.10

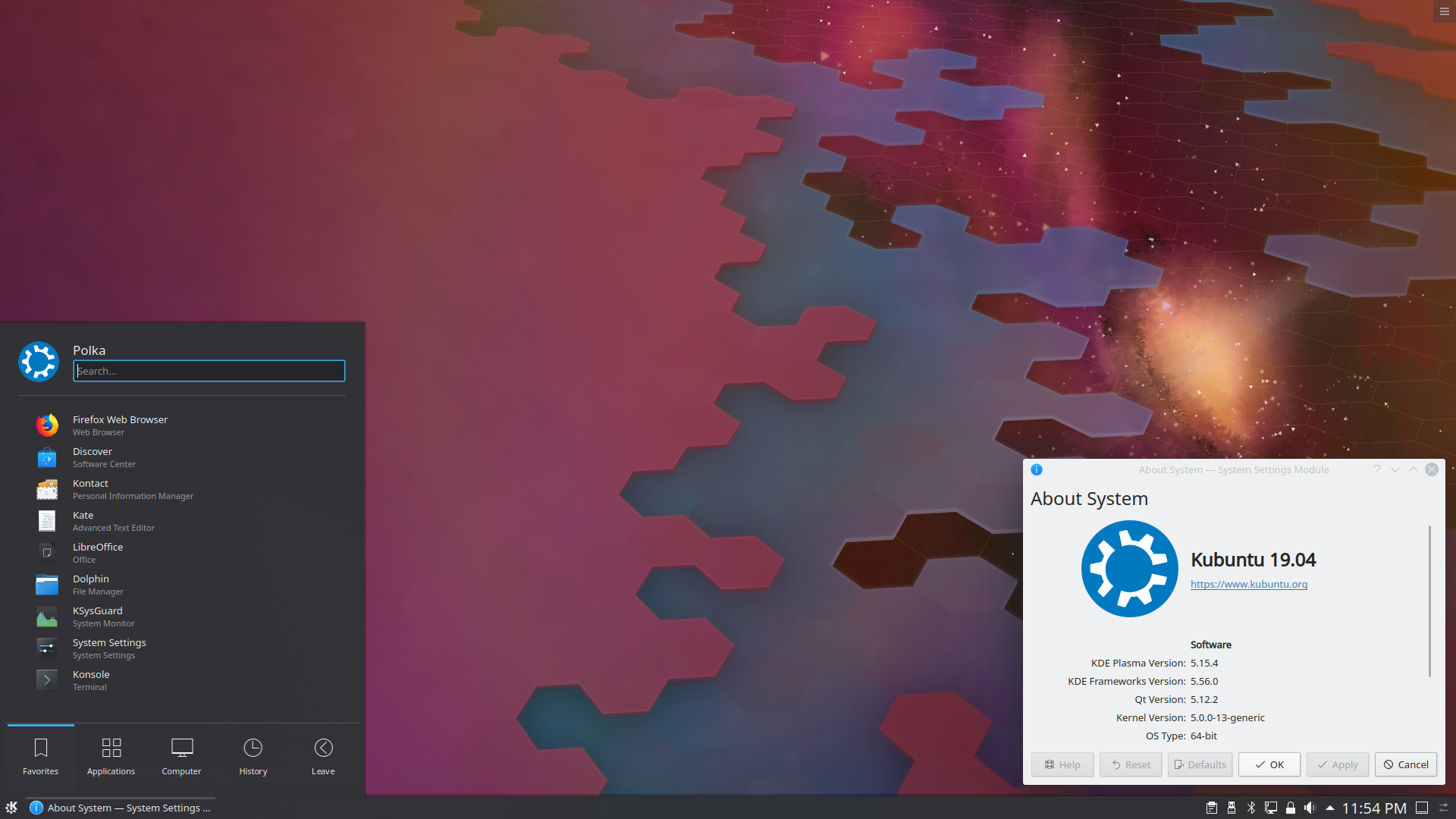
Kubuntu 19.04

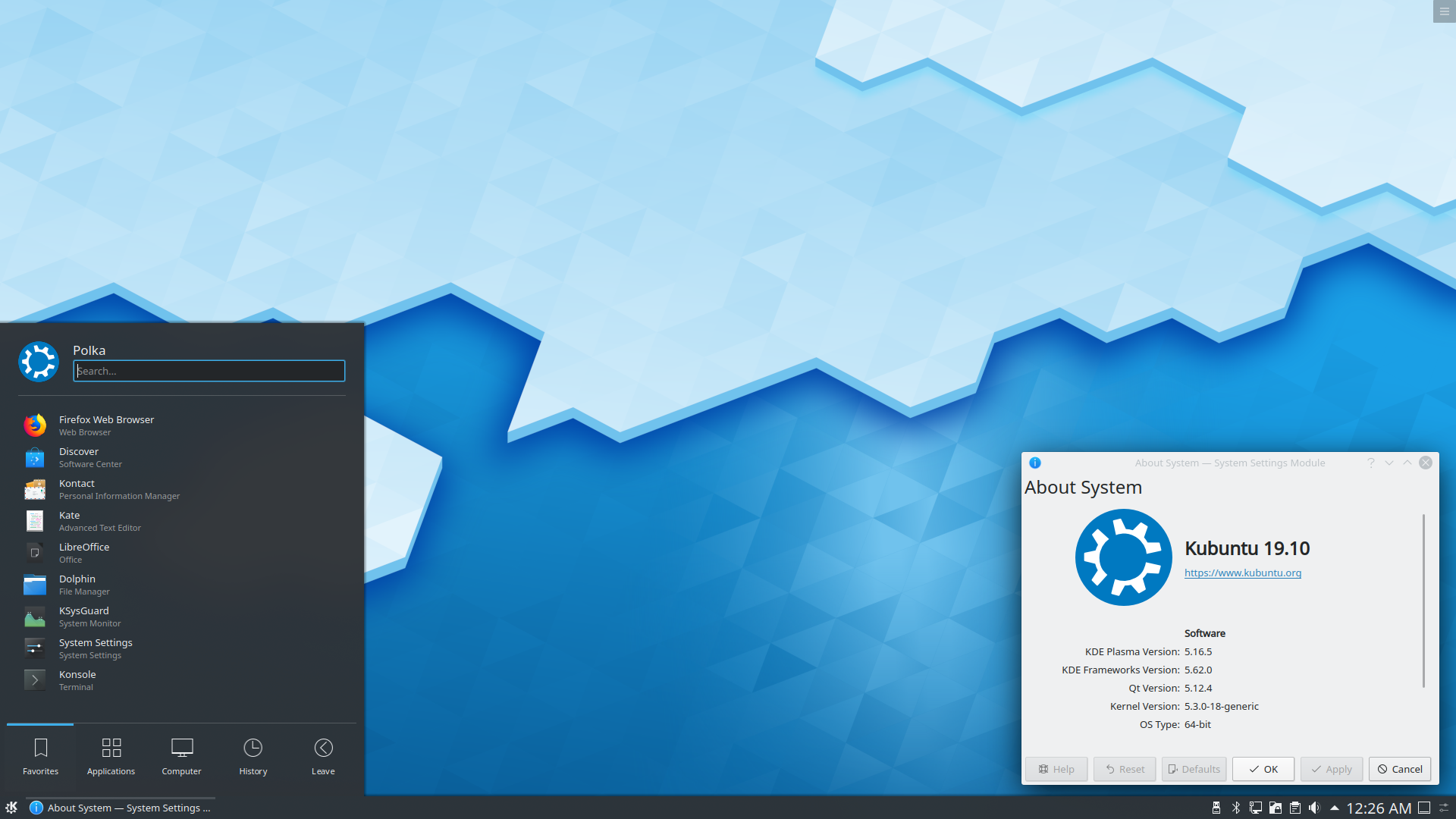
Kubuntu 19.10

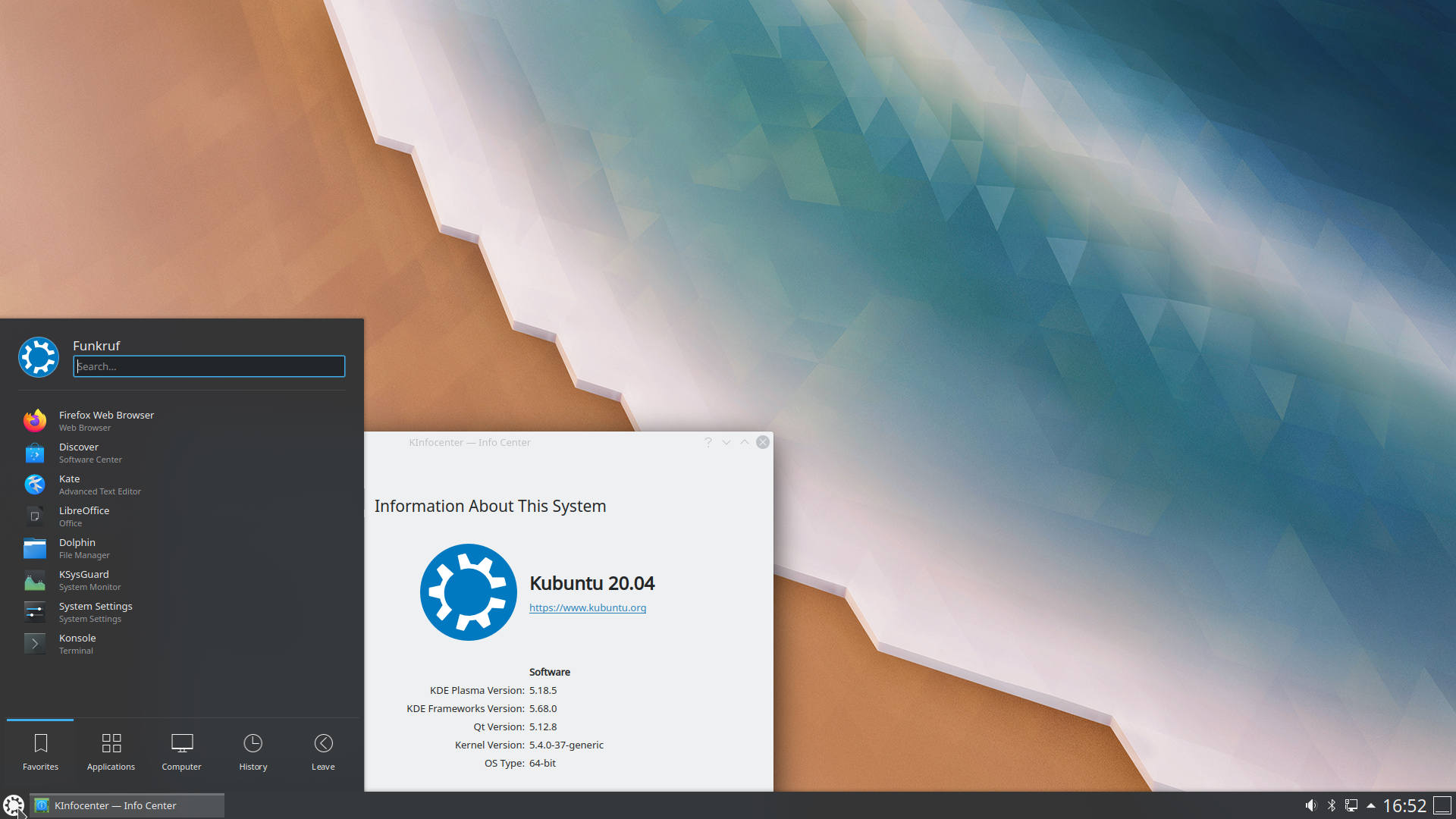
Kubuntu 20.04 LTS

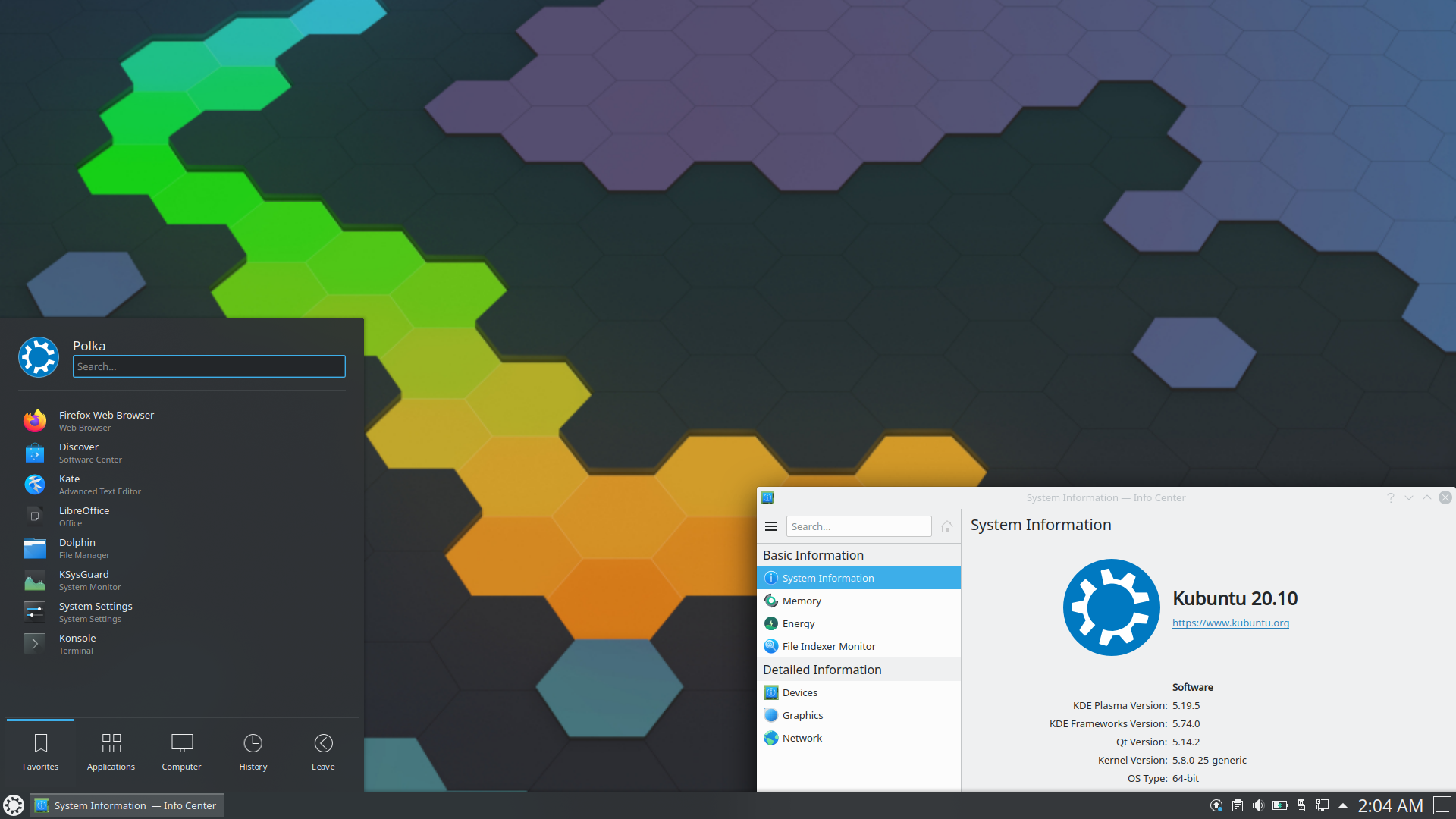
Kubuntu 20.10

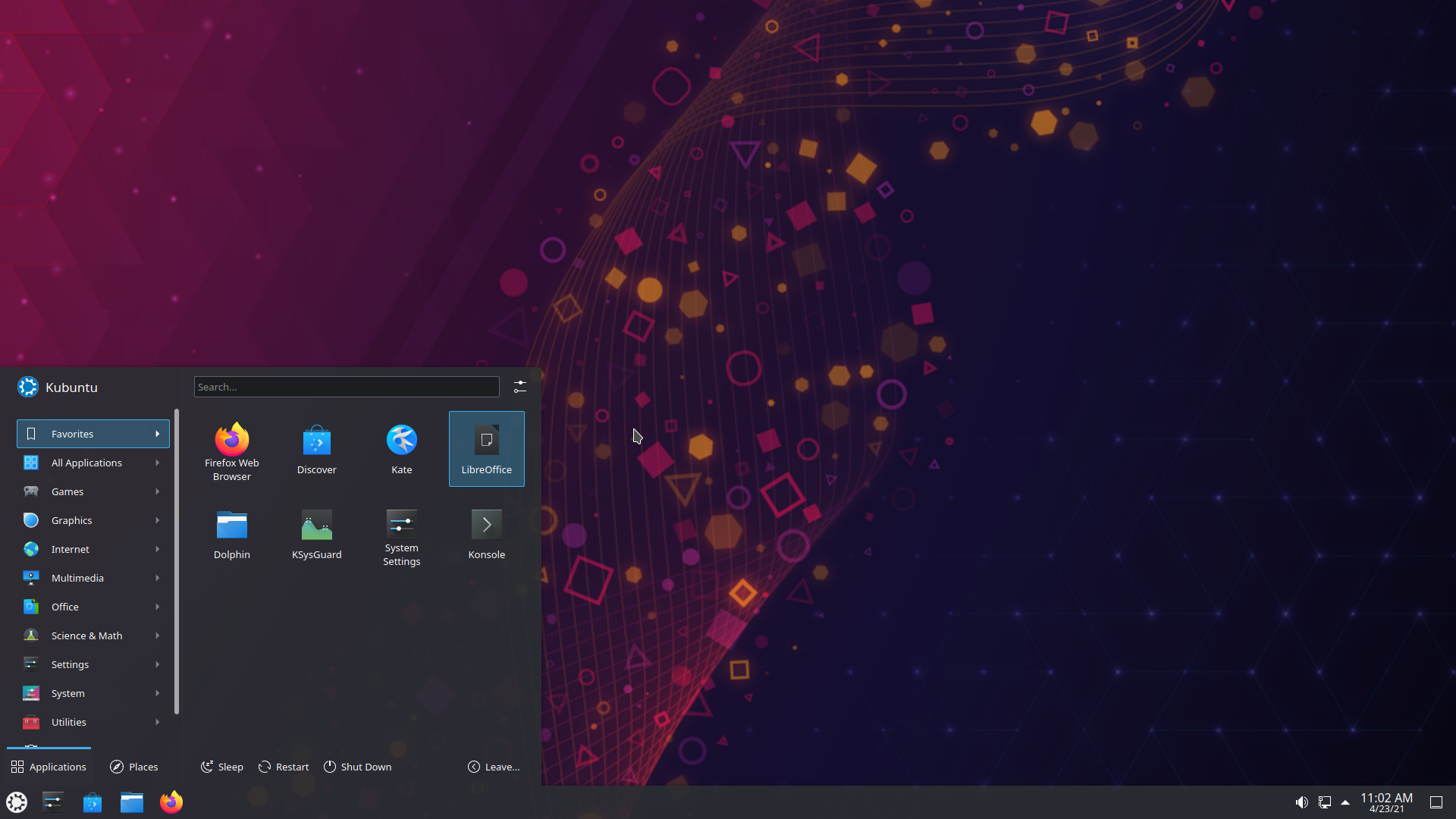
Kubuntu 21.04

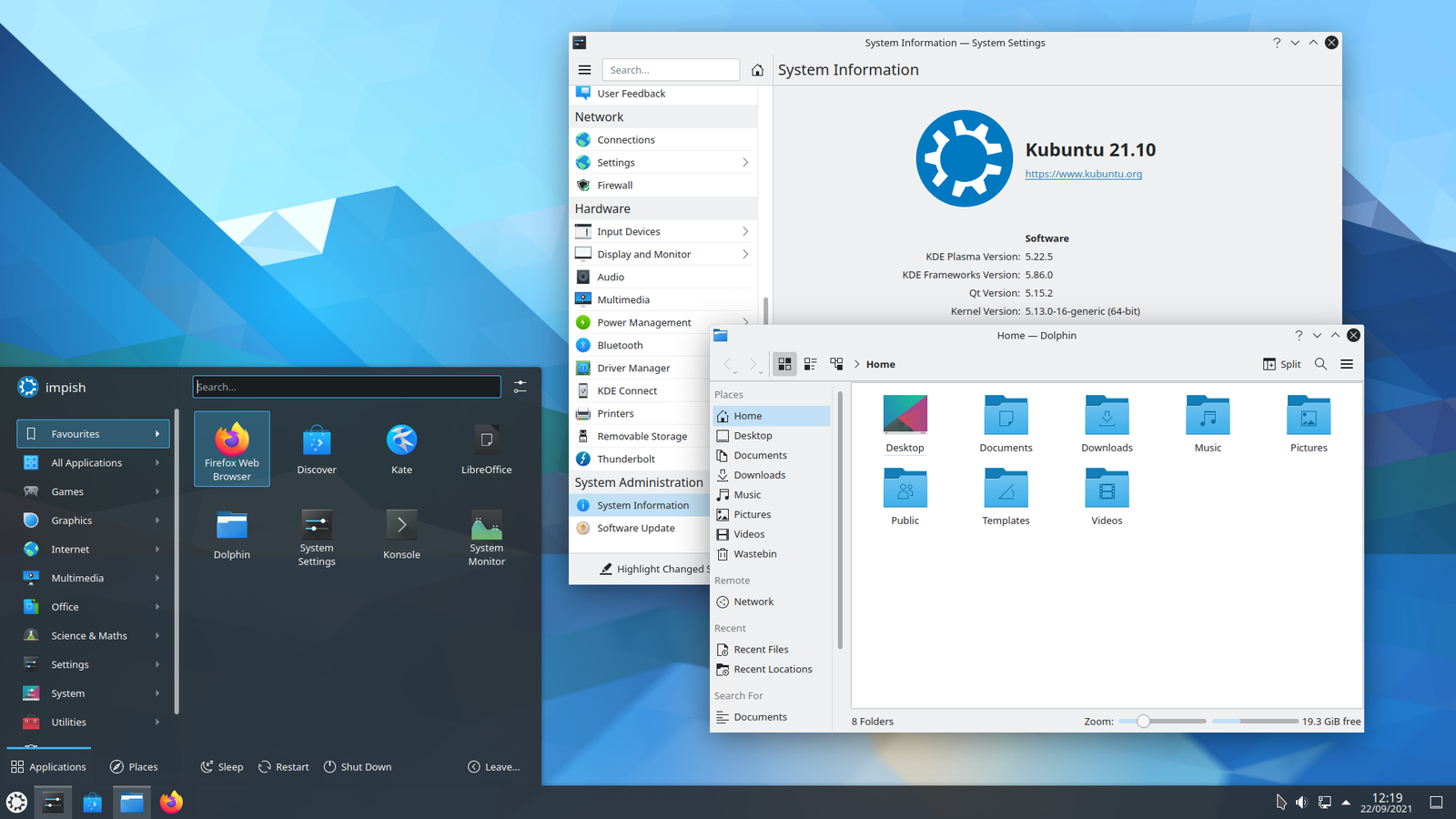
Kubuntu 21.10

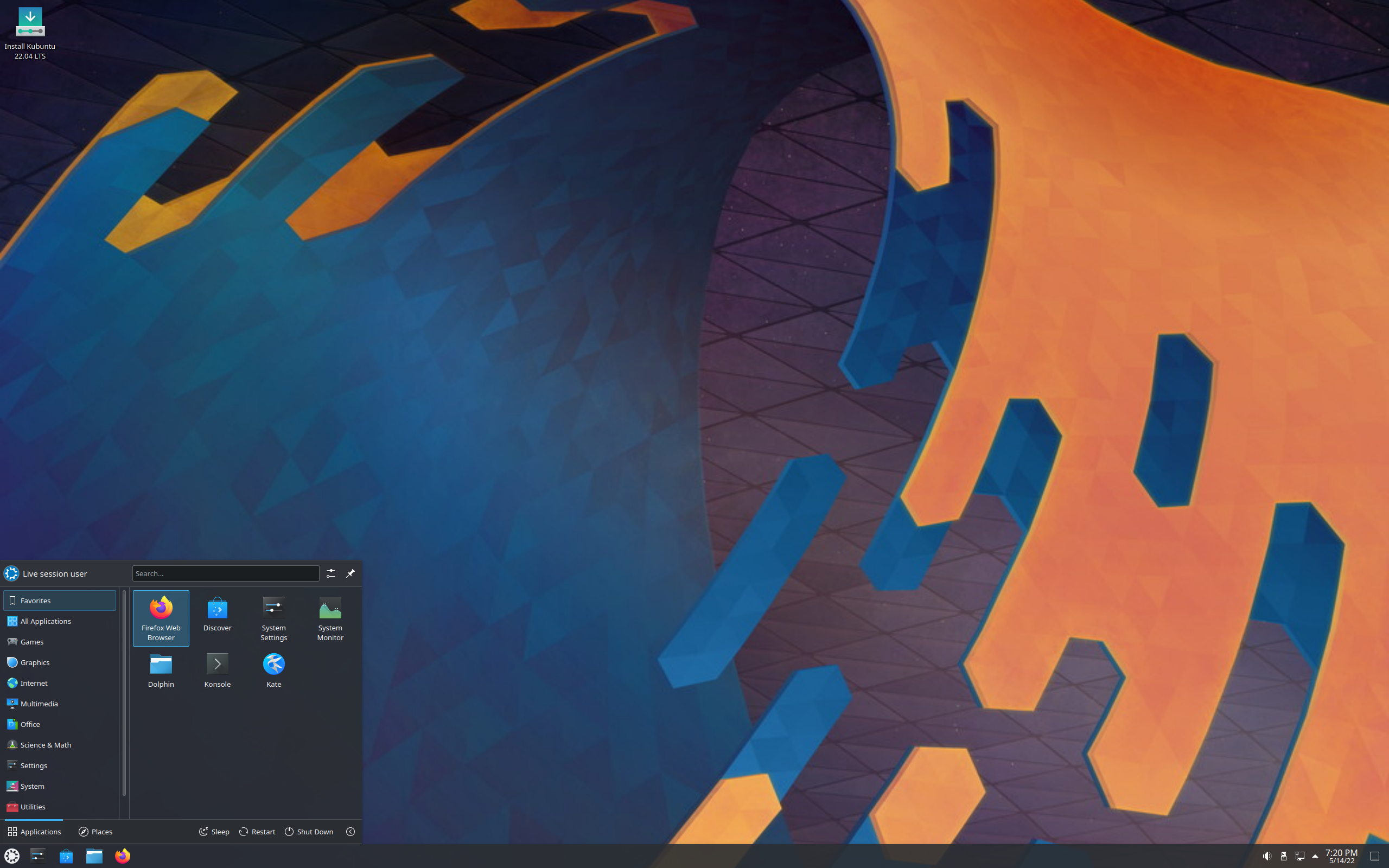
Kubuntu 22.04 LTS

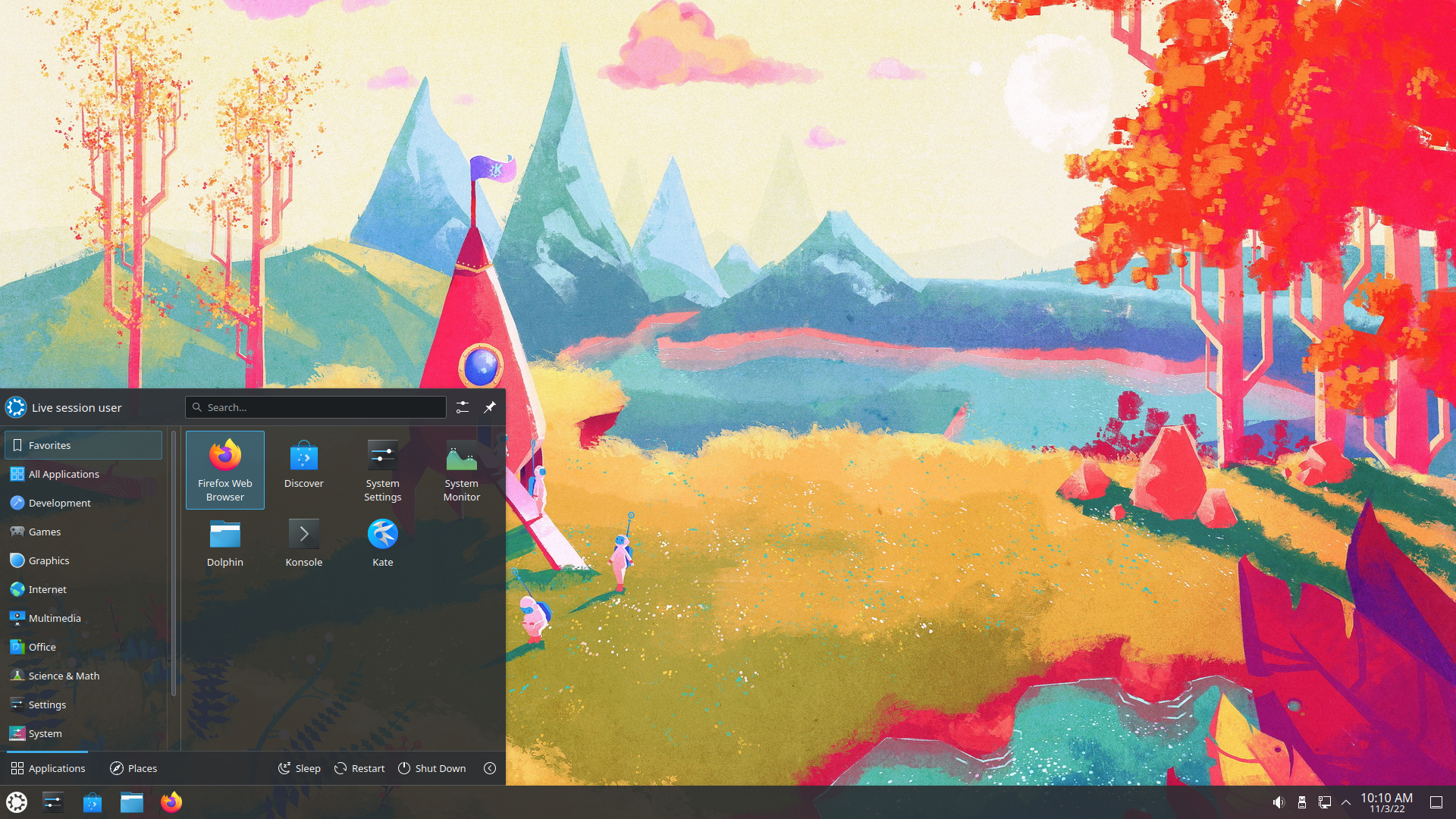
Kubuntu 22.10

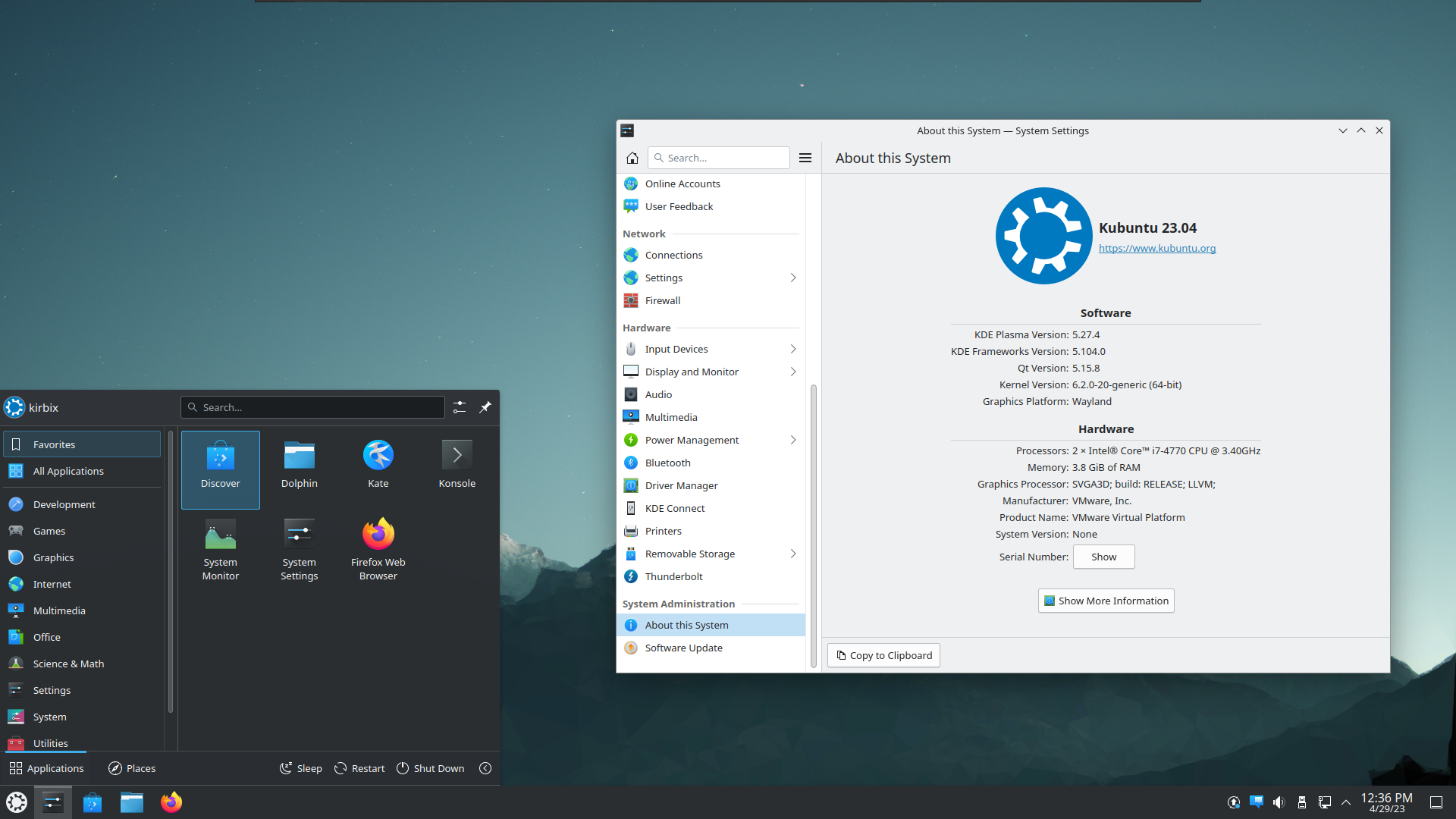
Kubuntu 23.04

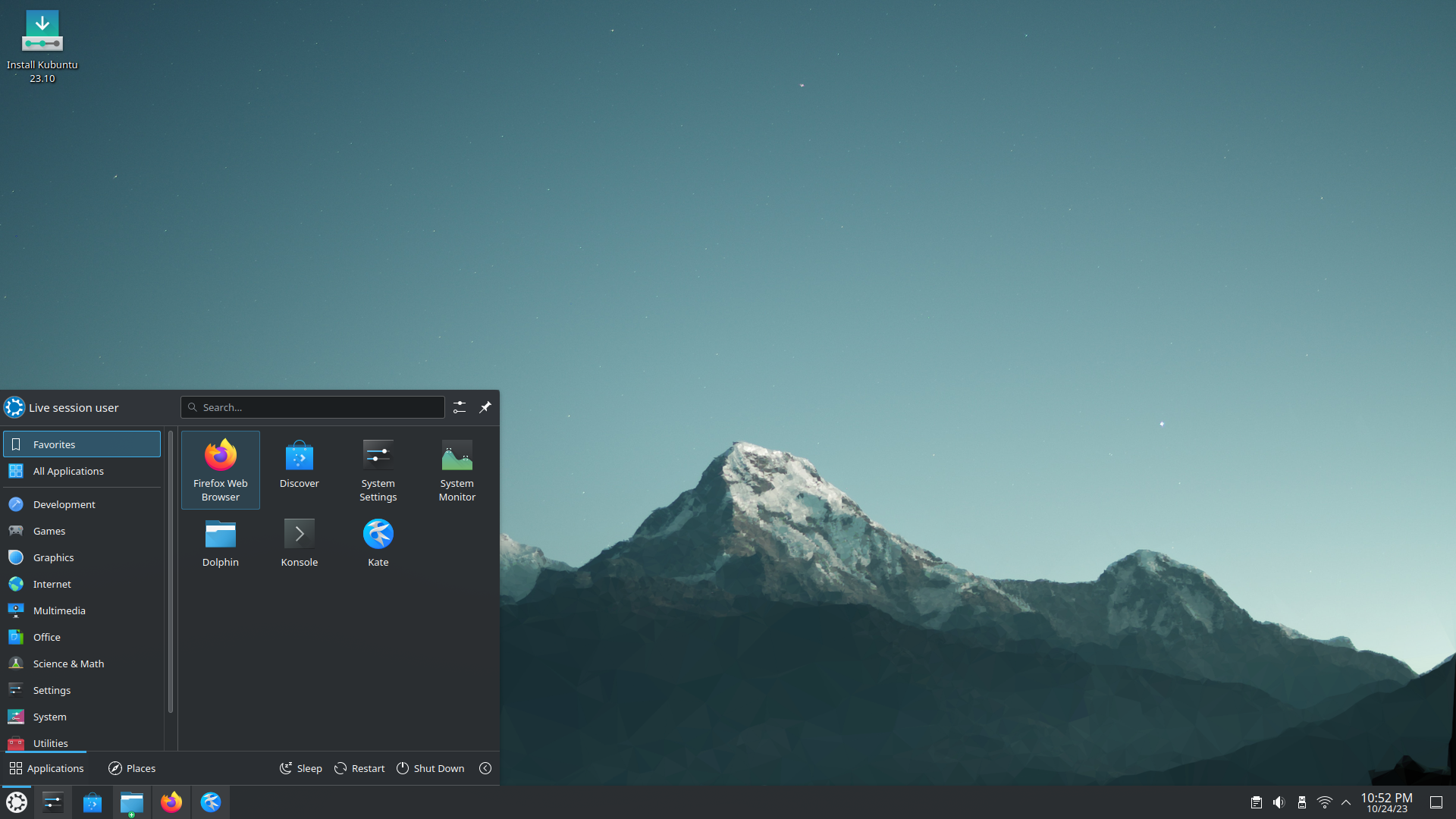
Kubuntu 23.10

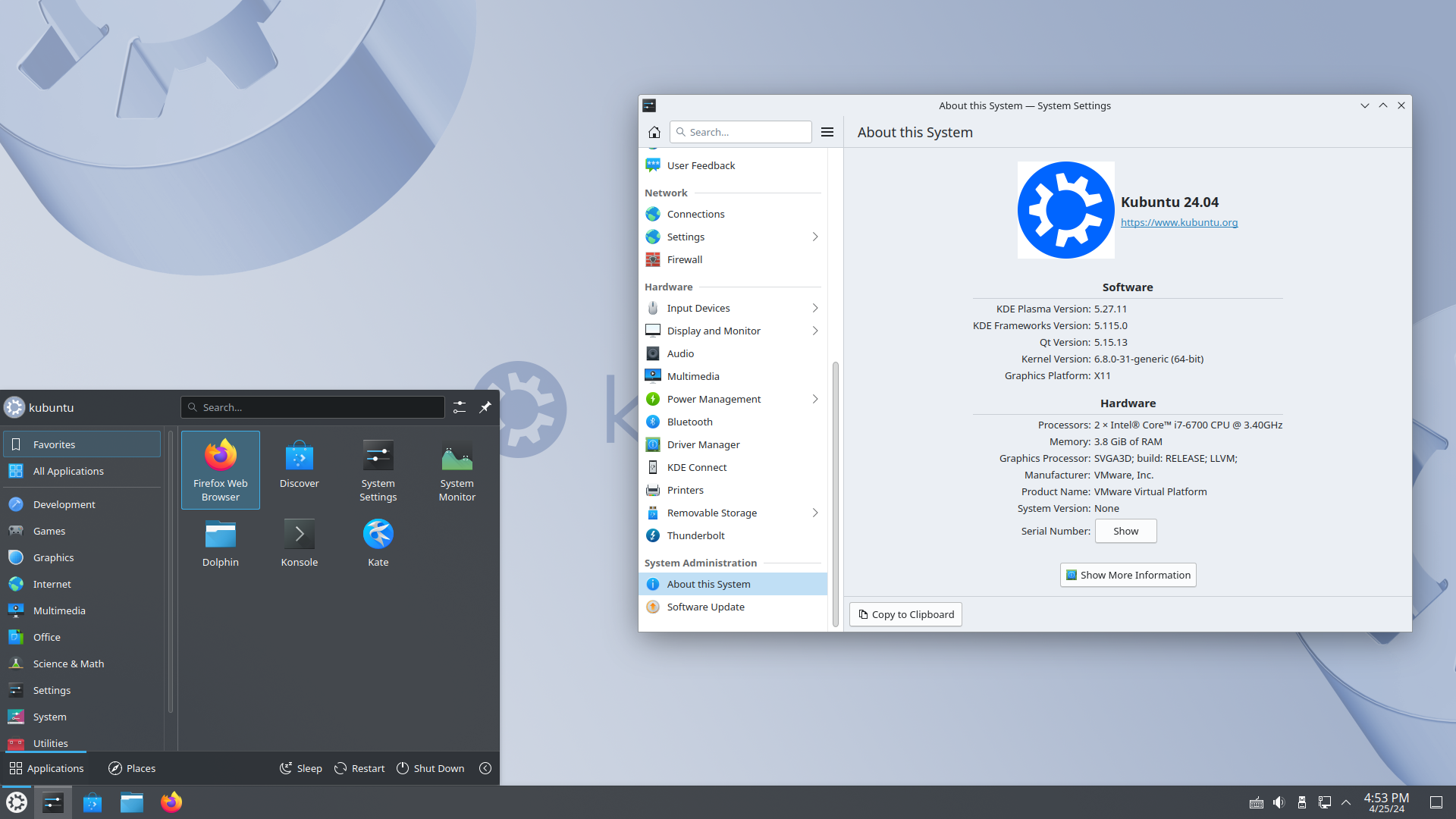
Kubuntu 24.04 LTS

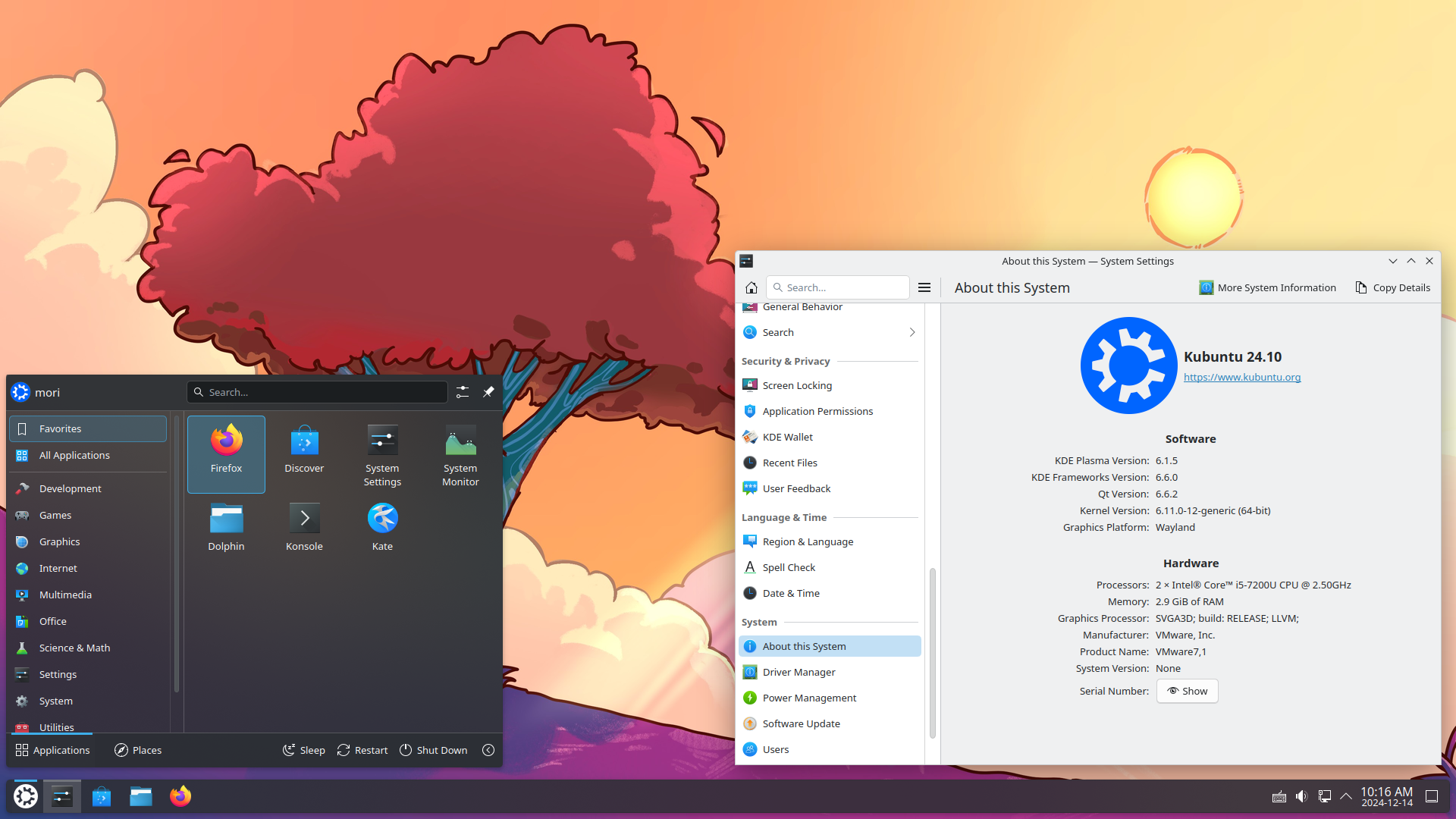
Kubuntu 24.10

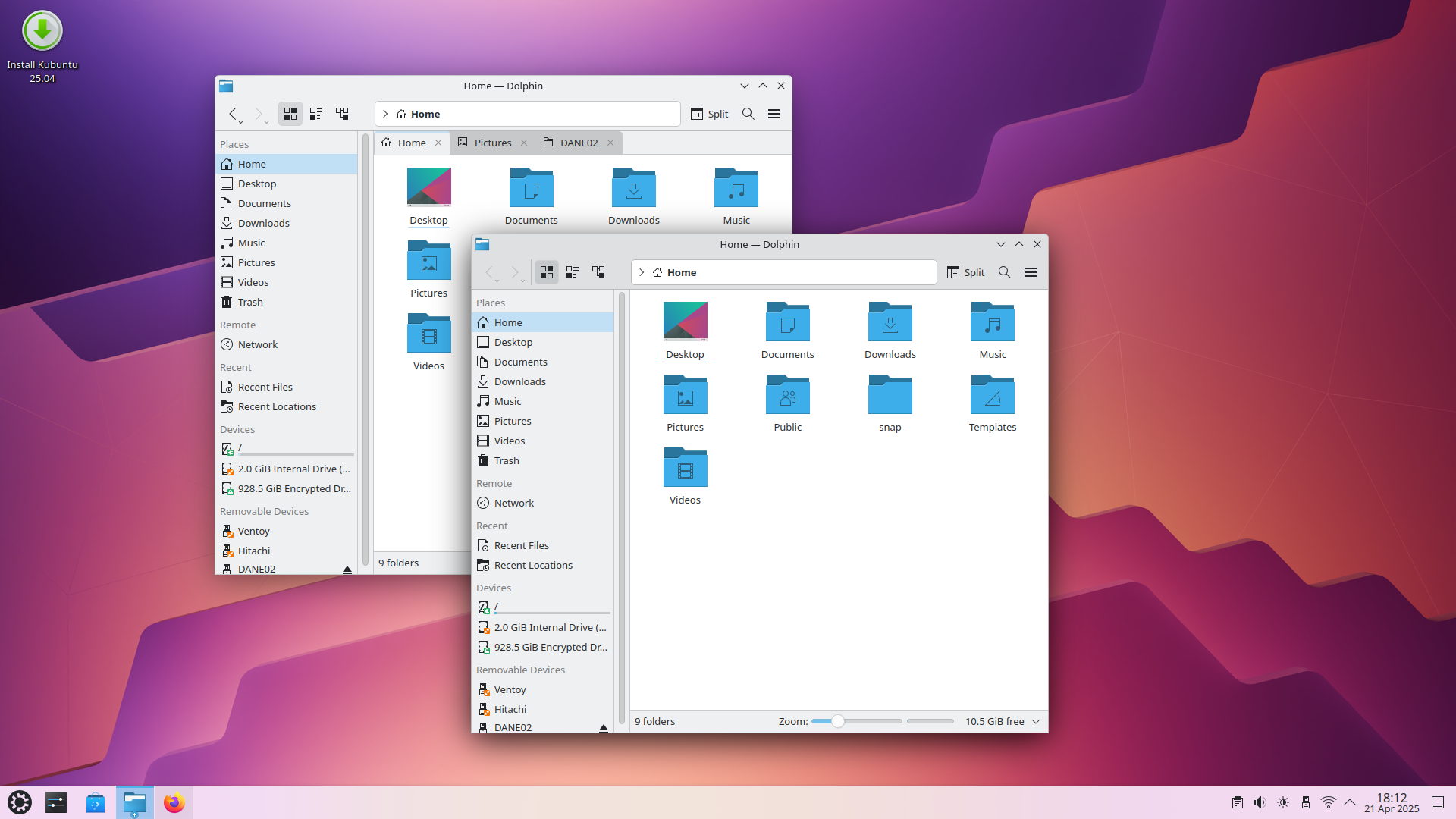
Kubuntu 25.04

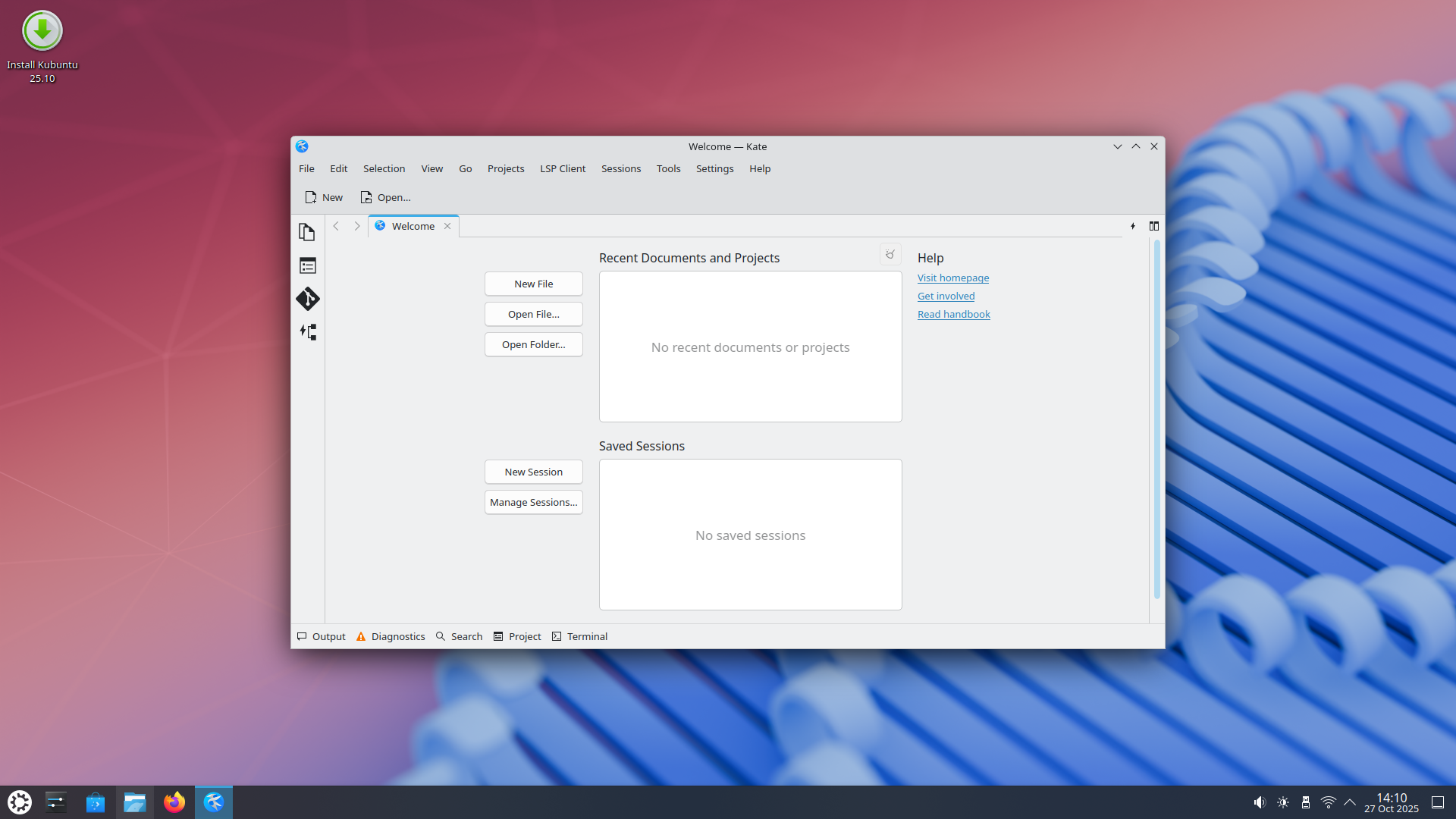
Kubuntu 25.10

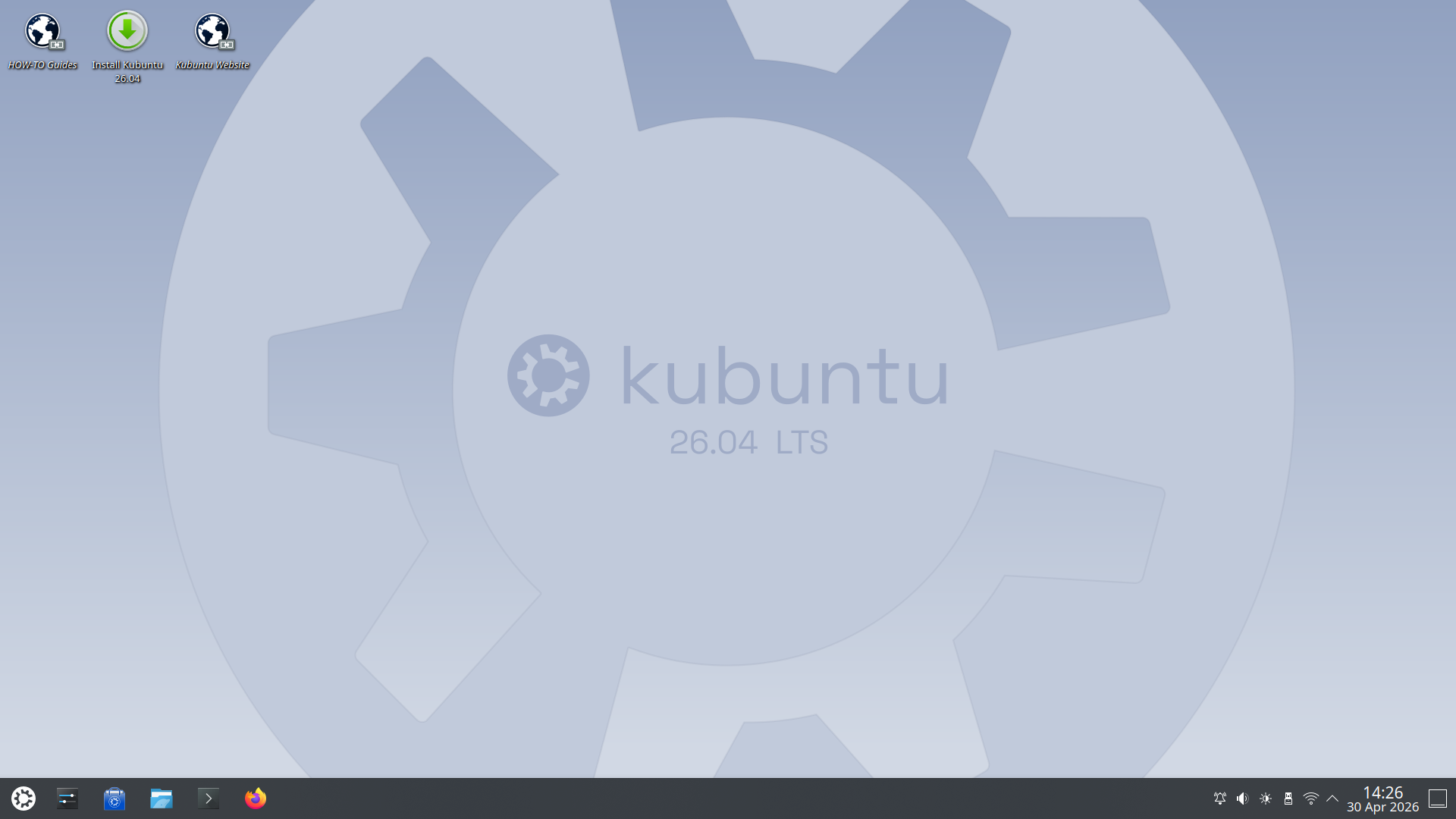
Kubuntu 26.04 LTS

== See also ==
- Comparison of Linux distributions
- KDE neon
- Lubuntu
- Xubuntu
