= Woof (software) =

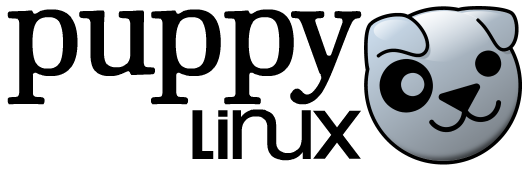
- Developer: Barry Kauler (original) community (current)
- Written in: Various (Notably C and Assembly)
- OS family: Linux
- Working state: Current
- Source model: Open source
- Initial release: 2009
- Repository: https://github.com/puppylinux-woof-CE/woof-CE
- Marketing target: Personal computers, mobile devices, embedded devices, servers,
- Available in: Multilingual
- Package manager: dpkg, Pacman, PETget, slapt-get, slackpkg, Puppy Package Manager
- Supported platforms: x86, x86-64, ARM
- Kernel type: Monolithic (Linux kernel)
- Userland: Various
- Default user interface: Many
- License: Many ("Linux" trademark owned by Linus Torvalds and administered by the Linux Mark Institute)
- Official website: puppylinux-woof-ce.github.io/woof-ce.html

Woof is a software application used to build a Puppy Linux distribution from another Linux distribution. This application must be run inside Puppy Linux, and an internet connection is required in order to download the other Linux distro's binary packages.

The CD-Remaster program available in Puppy Linux can be used to build variants of the Puppy Linux distribution.

In 2013, Woof was forked to Woof-CE, which uses a git version control system hosted on GitHub.

== Build process ==
The process used by Woof to build a Puppy Linux distribution from another Linux distribution:

1. The user selects the Linux distribution to be used as the foundation of the Puppy Linux distribution
2. The user selects the choice of packages and other options
3. The user initiates the build process
4. If needed for the selected Linux distribution, the scripts perform preprocessing tasks
5. The scripts download the package database files of the selected Linux distribution
6. The scripts download the package files of the selected Linux distribution
7. The scripts build the generic Puppy-packages
8. The scripts build the Puppy Linux live-CD .iso file of the Puppy Linux distribution
9. The user burns the Puppy Linux live-CD from the .iso file
10. If desired, the user builds a new variant of the Puppy Linux distribution using the CD-Remaster tool available in Puppy Linux

== Supported distributions ==
The Linux distributions that Woof can use as the foundation for a Puppy Linux distribution:

- Debian
- Devuan
- Raspbian
- Slackware
- Ubuntu
- Void
