= JWM =

JWM may refer to:

- Waco JWM, a straight-wing model based on the ASO
- JWM Partners, a hedge fund started in 1998
- Jacksonville Women's Movement, the origin of the Hubbard House, a not-for-profit 501(c)3 entity
- Joe's Window Manager, a X11 window manager written in C using Xlib.

== See also ==
- J.W.M. Turner, an English Romantic painter
- J.W.M. Appleton
