= Dropline GNOME =

dropline GNOME
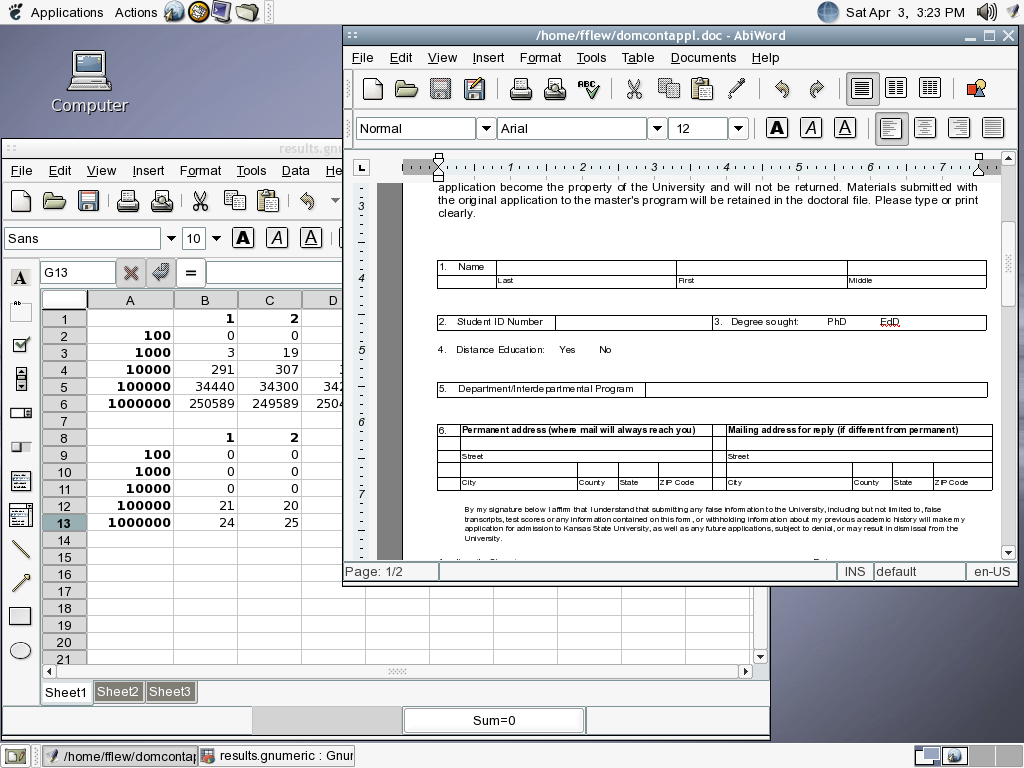
- The desktop, with a word processor and spreadsheets open
- Original author(s): Todd Kulesza
- Developer(s): dropline GNOME Development Team
- Initial release: 2002
- Stable release: 3.20 / December 31, 2017; 7 years ago
- Preview release: 3.20 RC1
- Written in: C Language
- Operating system: Slackware
- Type: Desktop
- License: GNU GPL and others.
- Website: www.droplinegnome.org

Dropline GNOME is a version of the GNOME desktop environment intended for use in Slackware. As Slackware has not included GNOME since 2005, Dropline GNOME is an option for Slackware users who wish to use GNOME as their desktops.

Dropline GNOME 3.20 was released on December 31, 2017.

== History ==
Due to developer constraints, the version of GNOME included with Slackware was inferior to that of many other distributions, and was later dropped entirely from the distribution. Dropline GNOME was created to account for the shortcomings and to fill the void left by this decision.

Todd Kulesza, dropline GNOME's founder, has retired from further work on it. Dropline GNOME is now being maintained by a small group of volunteers from around the world who build different parts of the system.

== Release cycle ==
Each minor (second version number) release of GNOME results in a new installer application and package group being released. However, subsequent micro (third version number, e.g. from 2.16.1 to 2.16.2) releases of GNOME are typically distributed in the form of individual package updates as source packages are updated, and do not require replacement of the installer package. To ensure that users do not easily fall behind in package updates, Dropline GNOME includes a panel applet to notify users when new packages for their installed release are available for download.

== Criticism ==
Dropline GNOME has been criticized by some, including Slackware creator Patrick Volkerding, for adding PAM to the system, and for replacing large system files, including the whole X11 system. However, the Dropline GNOME team has discontinued rebuilding X11 as of version 2.16.1. They use the official Slackware packages whenever possible, and publish a list of conflicting packages for each targeted Slackware system/release.

Cases such as the PAM addition are not done without merit, however, as pam_console is an essential component in providing functional automount support via HAL, the GNOME Volume Manager, and other software.
