= SuperGamer =

- OS family: Linux (Unix-like)
- Working state: Active
- Source model: Open source
- Latest release: SuperGamer 5 / January 2020
- Kernel type: Monolithic
- Default user interface: Xfce
- License: Various
- Official website: www.supergamer.x10host.com

SuperGamer is a Linux distribution for the x86 platform originally based on the PCLinuxOS distribution, and is currently based on VectorLinux. Focusing on gaming, it is designed to be run directly from a Live DVD.

== Features ==
Available in several different flavours, SuperGamer claims to be the "world’s first Dual Layer Live DVD". The most recent version, SuperGamer Supreme 2.5, can be downloaded as a 7.9 gigabyte iso file, while some older versions can also be downloaded in smaller sizes. As well as offering a wide selection of Linux native free games and shareware versions of commercial games, it also includes a wide selection of video card drivers, including proprietary binary blob drivers from NVIDIA and ATI as well as a wide array of free software alternatives.

As well as online downloads which are offered as a freely available torrent or a direct download available for a $5.00 fee. Though primarily intended for use as a Live DVD system only, SuperGamer can be installed onto a hard-drive using an included installer. There must already be a properly formatted partition on the drive and the user must be aware of the system's root password, which by default is set to "root".

== Included games ==
The distribution included games like: SuperGamer Supreme 2.5, contains Enemy Territory: Quake Wars, Unreal Tournament 2004, Doom 3, Prey, Quake 4, Savage 2: A Tortured Soul, Postal 2, Wolfenstein: Enemy Territory, Penumbra: Black Plague, Sauerbraten, Urban Terror, IconquerU, TORCS, Tremulous, CodeRED: Alien Arena, TrueCombat:Elite, America's Army, Nexuiz, OpenArena, PlaneShift, Drop Team, Frets On Fire, Chromium B.S.U., Mad Bomber, X-Moto, BZFlag, Mega Mario, Glaxium, GL-117, Neverball, Neverputt, Super Tux, PlanetPenguin Racer (a remake of Tux Racer), and X2: The Threat. Commercial games are included as shareware while free software and freeware ones are included in their entirety. While older version included games that were open source and demos, the newest release does not.

== Competition ==
Although very few distributions target the same niche as SuperGamer, it does have competition from the Linux-Gamers project, which offers a similar live gaming distribution. The two projects however do have slightly different goals and diverge in the games that they package.

== See also ==
- SteamOS
- VectorLinux
- Video games and Linux
