= Softlanding Linux System =

Linux distribution

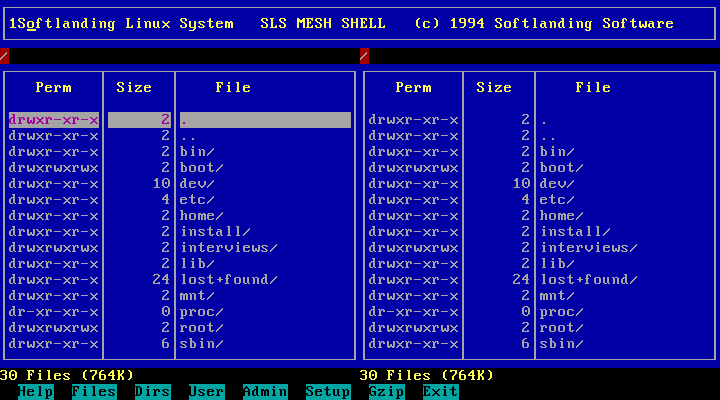
- Developer: Peter MacDonald
- OS family: Linux (Unix-like)
- Working state: Discontinued
- Initial release: May 1992; 34 years ago
- Latest release: 1.06 / 1994; 32 years ago
- Repository: github.com/rdebath/SLS-1.02
- Supported platforms: i386
- Kernel type: Monolithic (Linux)
- Influenced: Slackware, Debian

Softlanding Linux System (SLS) was one of the first Linux distributions. The first release was by Peter MacDonald in May 1992. Their slogan at the time was "Gentle touchdowns for DOS bailouts." SLS was the first release to offer a comprehensive Linux distribution containing more than the Linux kernel, GNU, and other basic utilities, including an implementation of the X Window System.

== History ==
SLS was the most popular Linux distribution at the time, but it was considered to be rather buggy by its users. It was soon superseded by Slackware (which started as a cleanup of SLS by Patrick Volkerding) and Yggdrasil Linux/GNU/X, among others. Similarly, Ian Murdock's frustration with SLS led him to create the Debian project.

== Series ==
The system consists of the following series which were installed via floppy disk:

- a1-a4: The minimal base system
- b1-b8: Base system extras (man pages, Emacs, etc.)
- c1-c3: The compiler(s), gcc/g++/p2c/f2c
- d1-d2: Documentation
- s1: Source
- t1-t3: TeX document processing
- x1-x11: X Window System distribution, documentation and idraw

== Version History ==
Known SLS releases
Version	Release date
0.96c	12 August 1992
0.98	7 October 1992
1.01	18 April 1993
1.02	28 April 1993
1.03	5 August 1993
1.04	21 October 1993
1.05	5 April 1994
1.06	Late 1994
