= MtPaint =

Free software graphics editor

mtPaint
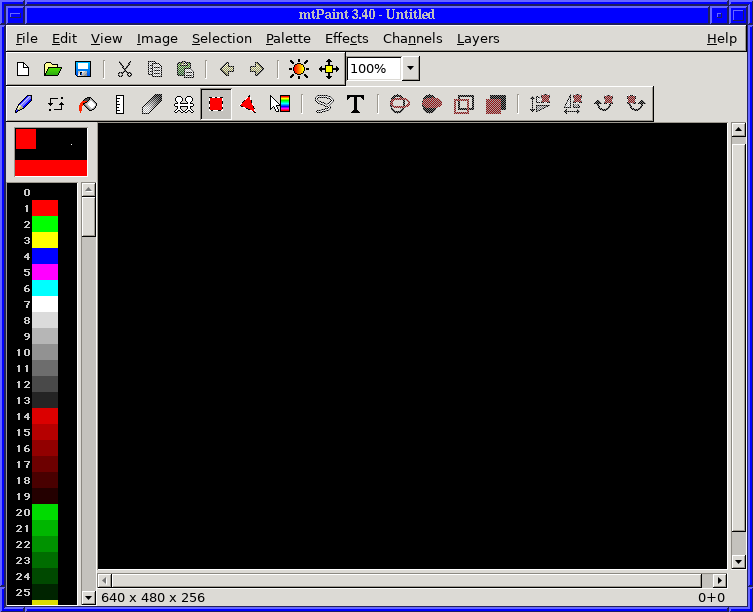
- mtPaint 3.40
- Original author: Mark Tyler
- Developer: Dmitry Groshev
- Initial release: September 13, 2004; 21 years ago
- Stable release: 3.50 / 1 January 2021
- Written in: C
- Operating system: Windows, Linux
- Platform: IA-32 and x64
- Size: 1797 kb (installed)
- Available in: 18 languages
- Type: Raster graphics editor
- License: GPL-3.0-or-later
- Website: mtpaint.sourceforge.net

mtPaint (short for Mark Tyler's Painting Program) is a free and open-source raster graphics editor for creating icons, pixel art and for photo editing. It is available for Microsoft Windows and Linux operating systems.

== History ==
mtPaint was originally written by Mark Tyler specifically for Linux operating systems, as a personal project for his own use. He evaluated existing graphics editors, but decided to write his own from scratch. Work was started on 7 August 2004 and the first public release was made on 13 September 2004. Of the development speed, Tyler noted, "This rapid development was only possible after I used and studied an excellent program call mhWaveEdit, written by Magnus Hjorth, in the Spring of 2004. As well as being an extremely good wave editing program, I also learnt many valuable lessons from this program."

One of the design aims was to produce a lightweight graphics editors that could be run on older hardware. As such the interface uses the GTK 1/2 toolkit. Other design goals included that it be fast, reliable and free software under the GNU General Public License to protect user freedom.

The first release was version 0.23 and it featured an indexed palette system, but no RGB support. Following version 0.30 the program was ported to Microsoft Windows as Tyler personally wanted to use it on a Windows computer he had.

The version number went directly from release 0.97 to 2.00, with no 1.00 series. Version 2.00 was released on 7 August 2005. Tyler explained the version numbering, "To go from version 0.97 to 1.00 would not have reflected the quantum leap in functionality due to the implementation of layer facilities."

Version 3.00 introduced channels with help from Dmitry Groshev, who did the work to implement the alpha (transparency), selection and mask channels. Groshev's coding was the first time that another developer's work had been directly written for mtPaint, although open source code from other projects had been incorporated previously. Version 3.00 also marked the start of a user manual for the program.

Following 3.00 Tyler decided to leave the mtPaint and work on other software projects and Groshev became the maintainer. He continued to slowly add features and functionality, but through a slow cycle of releases. Version 3.50 was released on 31 December 2020 and is the most recent release.

mtPaint has been included as a default application with a number of Linux distributions, including all the LXDE versions of Lubuntu (18.04 LTS and earlier), Linux Mint as well as Puppy Linux.

== Features ==
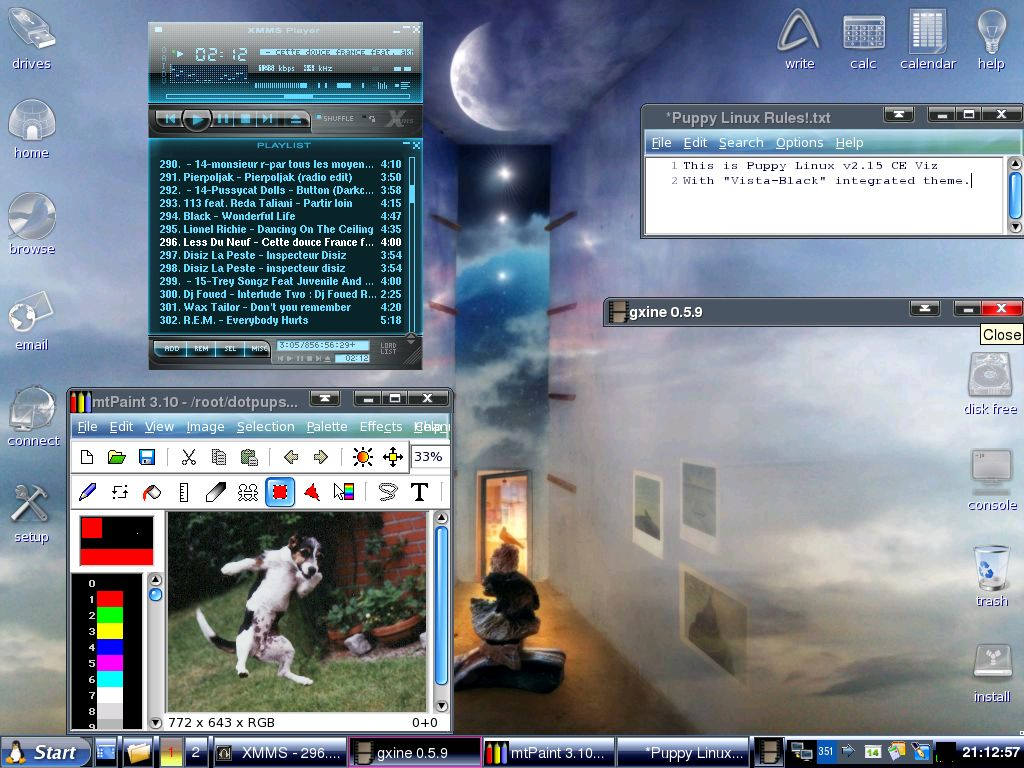
mtPaint running on Puppy Linux

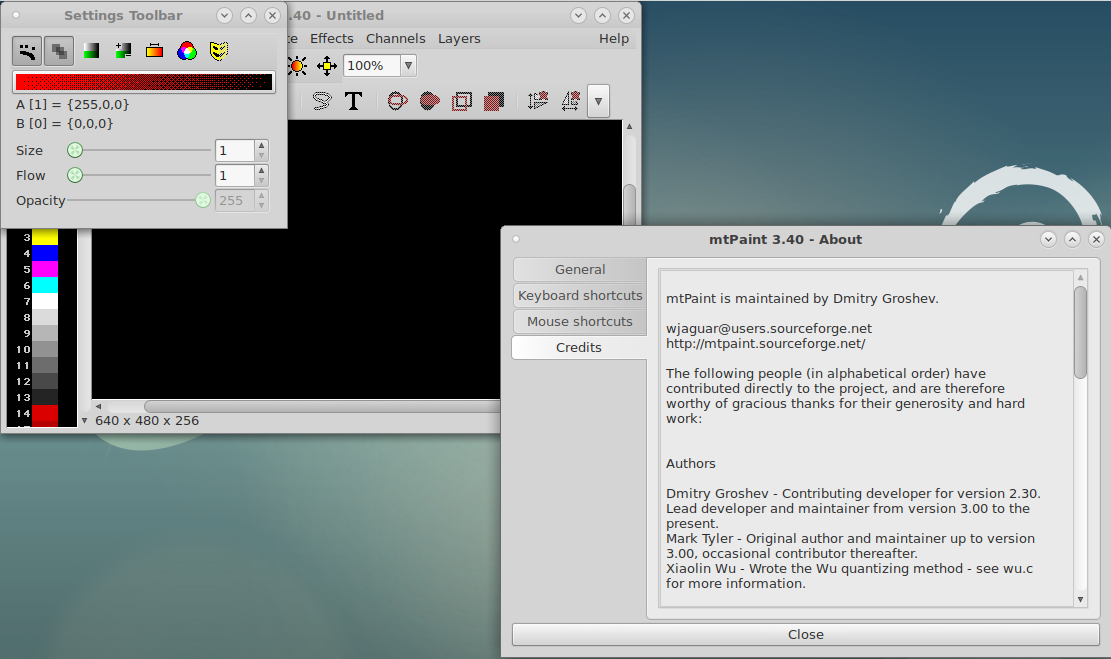
mtPaint running on Debian.

mtPaint includes a range of features for creating drawings and editing photographs. These include:

- Vertical and horizontal split views
- Wide range of shortcut keys
- 12 image clipboard
- "undo" up to 1,000 times
- Image zoom from 10% and 2000%
- Languages: Chinese (Simplified), Chinese (Taiwanese), Czech, Dutch, English (UK), French, Galician, German, Italian, Japanese, Polish, Portuguese, Portuguese (Brazilian), Russian, Slovak, Spanish, Swedish, Turkish
- Screenshot support
- 100 layers
- 81 brush shapes
- User defined gradients
- scaling and resizing images
- rotating, including arbitrary rotation angles
- effects including inverting, grayscale, isometric transformations, edge detect, sharpen, unsharp mask, soften, Gaussian blur, emboss and bacteria

=== File formats ===
mtPaint supports BMP, GIF, JPEG, LSS, PNG, TGA, TIFF, XPM and XBM formats for both loading and saving images.

== Reception ==
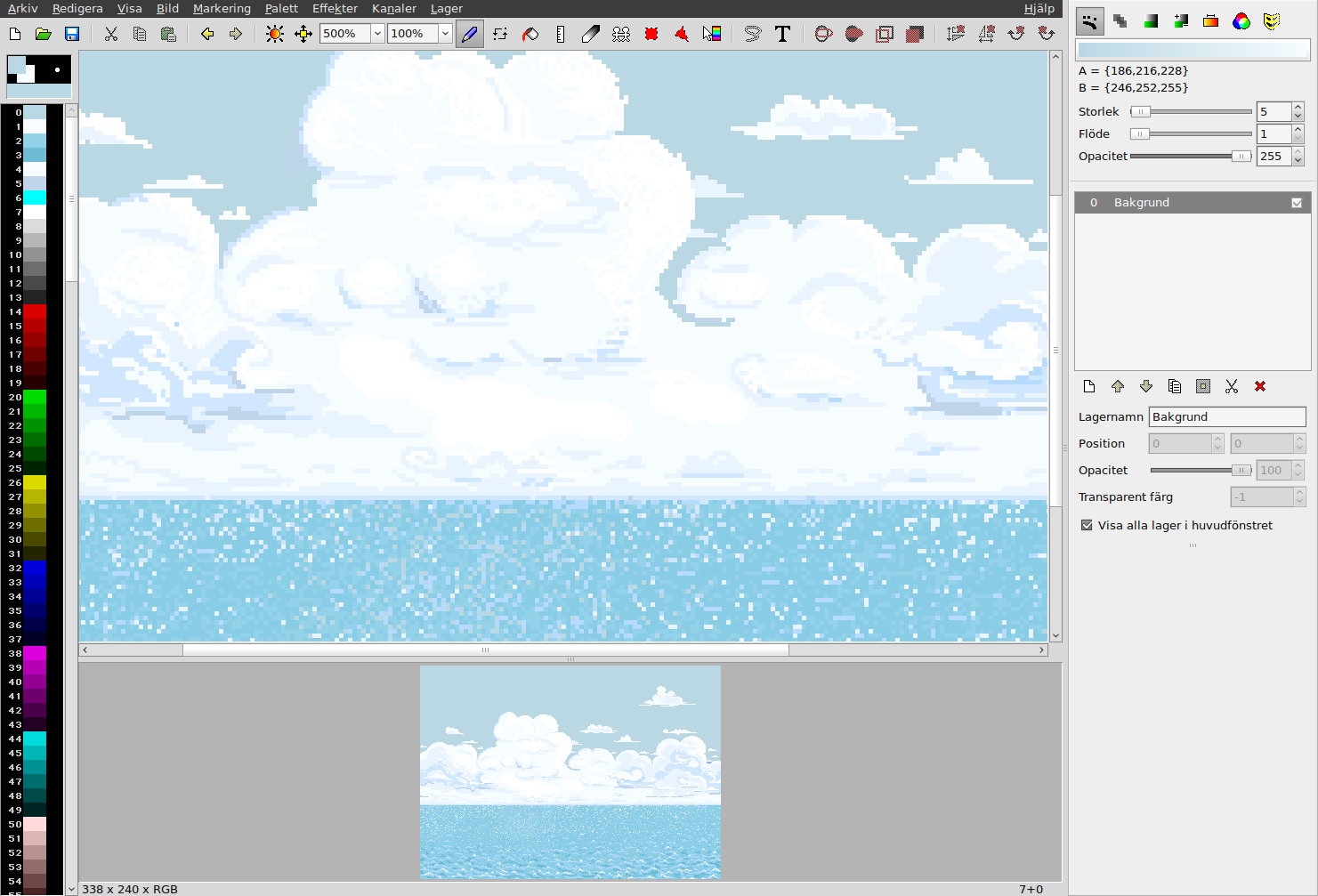
Creating pixel art on mtPaint 3.40

mtPaint has been criticized for low discoverability of features, by users and even by the lead developer, Dmitry Groshev, who noted that its features, "may look opaque to users who do not like to read docs; but not everything in image processing can be made self-explanatory, particularly if one tries to keep the program small. Those features which aren't obvious, have explanations in the handbook; time spent looking them up will be well rewarded by not wasting time on learning things by trial and error." Some users have written their own guides to make up for deficiencies in the official mtPaint Handbook.

A 2015 review on Softpedia noted that the mtPaint GTK interface looks "outdated", but concluded, "although it hasn't been updated for a while and the interface could use some work in the graphical department, mtPaint features some pretty advanced options to help you manipulate images."

Reviewer Seth Kenlon praised mtPaint in 2017, writing, "what makes mtPaint great is that it specializes in pixel art, has a tiny footprint—the application is about 391k, compiled (assuming Gtk is installed separately)—and it is designed to run efficiently on specs as low as 200MHz CPU with 16MB of available RAM."

Linux Experten noted, "due to its efficient design, it can run on older PC hardware (such as a 200mhz cpu and 32mb frame). It can edit indexed palette or 24 bit RGB images and offer basic painting and palette manipulation tools. It aims to be simple and easy to use."

A review in Top Best Alternatives praised mtPaint's "efficient and simple interface".

A 2017 review by Martins D. Okoi for FOSSMint noted the infrequent releases of mtPaint, but praised its small memory footprint and advanced features.

A 2020 review in Full Circle magazine concluded, "mtPaint is a very mature application – with 15 years of development behind it. It is fast to use, and has enough features that many users will find it very useful for photo editing and making drawings."

== See also ==
- Comparison of raster graphics editors
