= VectorLinux =

Linux distribution

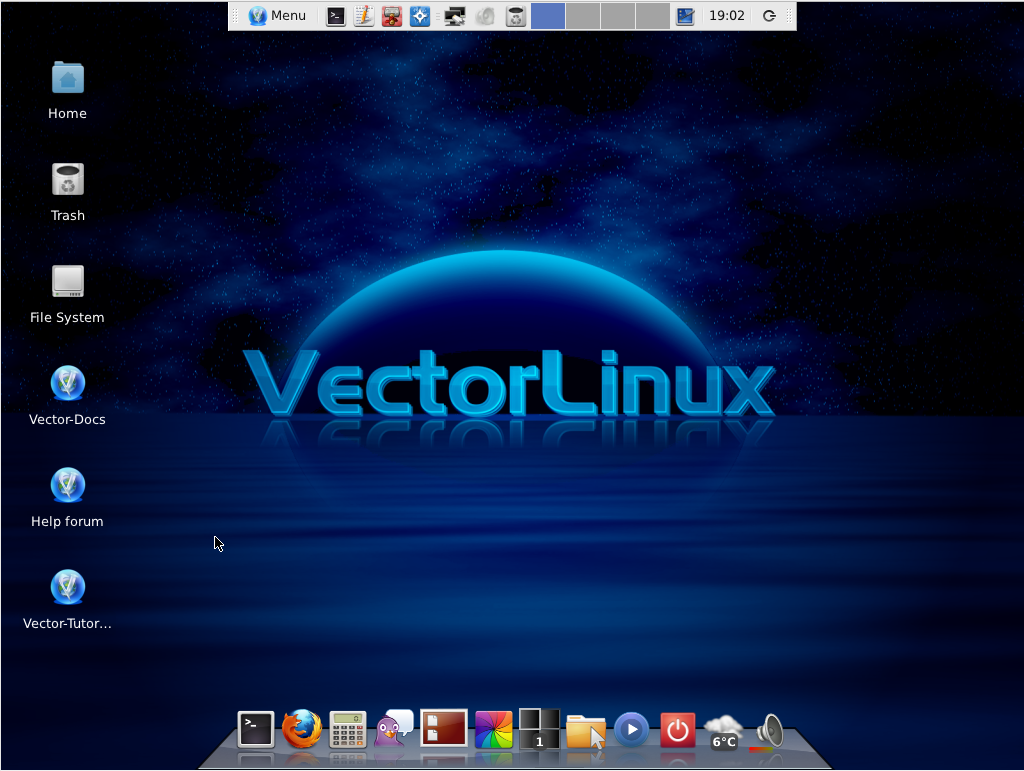
- Standard Edition Gold 7.0
- Developer: Robert S. Lange; Darrell Stavem
- OS family: Linux (Unix-like)
- Working state: Discontinued
- Source model: Open source
- Latest release: VL 7.2 / August 28, 2017; 9 years ago
- Supported platforms: x86-64, i486
- Kernel type: Monolithic (Linux)
- Default user interface: Xfce, KDE, LXDE, Openbox, JWM, IceWM
- License: Various
- Official website: !Dead Link! {www.vectorlinux.com} see external links

VectorLinux, abbreviated VL, was a Linux distribution for the x86 platform based on the Slackware Linux distribution, originally developed by Canadian developers Robert S. Lange and Darrell Stavem. Since version 7 the Standard Edition is also available for the x86-64 platform, known as VLocity64 7.

== Editions ==
Four editions of VectorLinux were maintained: SOHO, Standard, Light and Live.

=== SOHO Edition (Discontinued after version 7.0) ===
The SOHO (Small Office/Home Office) Edition is designed for modern computers and is based on the KDE desktop environment. Applications include LibreOffice, Java, the GIMP, Xsane, CUPS, Xara Xtreme, financial applications, and others. A deluxe edition of SOHO, which contains additional applications, is also available.

=== Standard Edition ===
Standard Edition is a freely downloadable distribution based on Xfce and specifically designed for use on older computers with slower processors and less RAM. The Deluxe Standard Version contains the standard edition plus numerous additional applications specific to that VL version. Additional included applications are LibreOffice and GIMP among many others.

=== Light Edition ===
The Light Edition is designed for older computers with limited resources. Version 7.2 is based upon the IceWM window manager. It is supplied with Seamonkey as the browser/email client/html editor and includes some of the applications found in the Standard Edition. Additional applications are available through the package manager or by compiling user applications. Light Edition is usable on computers with 256 MB of RAM.

=== Live Edition ===
The Live Editions are bootable CDROMs which contain the VectorLinux operating system on the CD. This enables the user to test a distribution on a system without the need of re-partitioning and installing to the hard drive. It is also possible to install VectorLinux from the Live Edition CD. VectorLinux presently has two Live Editions: Standard and SOHO. The latest edition is a preview of the Deluxe Edition.

The SuperGamer distribution is based on the VectorLinux code base.

Version 7.1 does not have a live edition.

Version 7.2 Standard (XFCE) has a live edition. Version 7.2 Light (IceWM) does not have a live edition.

== Features ==
One prominent feature that all VL versions have in common is the standard installation of system administration applications: VasmCC handles system configuration, while slapt-get with its GUI front-end Gslapt manages software installation and removal.

VasmCC stands for 'Vector Administrative and Services Menu Control Center', and it configures everything from disk partitions to X.Org Server. In addition to offering a GUI interface, a text mode parallel to the GUI VasmCC is available. VasmCC has been available since Vector 2.0 was released and has been upgraded continually over the years, with the addition of GUI functionality in SOHO 3.2. Configuration tools like netconfig and alsaconf are also available in Vector.

Gslapt is a GUI front-end to the slapt-get software management tool. Combined with lzma-compression and dependency tracking, the inclusion of Gslapt offers VectorLinux users the ability to quickly install and remove software while avoiding so-called 'dependency hell.' File compression via lzma allows low and high bandwidth users alike to minimize download times.

=== Package management ===
Two graphical frontends have been written for slapt-get, the backwards-compatible dependency-tracking extension to Slackware's package tools used by VectorLinux. VL-APT was the first, written originally by the Vector developers to serve the need for GUI package installation and management, while gslapt was written by the original developers of slapt-get for the same purpose. Until recently, either option has been viable; however, recent changes in the slapt-get packaging format have made VL-APT obsolete, and the developers of Vector have consequently promoted gslapt as the preferred method of graphical package management.

VL-APT (now deprecated) and gslapt are configured by default to use Vector's repository, which offers the majority of most users' needs. However, alternative sources, including mirrors of the official archives around the world, can be added through their respective configuration menus, or directly, through the textual slapt-getrc configuration. There is criticism, at least partially justified, regarding the size of the Vector package selection. These deficiencies have stimulated significant volunteer and developer response, and many desired software packages have now entered the Vector repository.

In fact, it is not uncommon to use the information in /etc/slackware-version in Vector to download and install Slackware packages from LinuxPackages(dot)net, a common Slackware repository, GnomeSlackBuild, etc.

Vector Linux uses .tlz packages (LZMA-packed), though .tbz and .tgz are supported too. Pkgtools are taken from Tukaani Linux project and are non-standard - there are improvements over standard pkgtools in speed of operation, but have not been updated for a while.

== See also ==
- List of Linux distributions
- Comparison of Linux distributions
