= GL-117 =

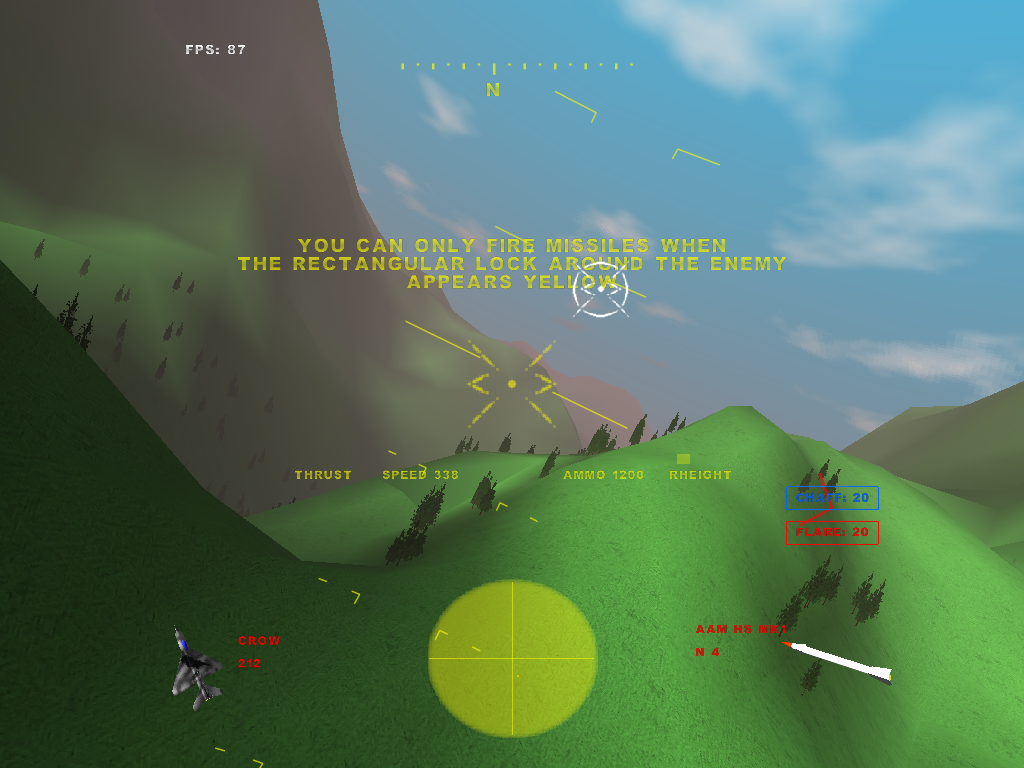
- GL-117
- Developers: Thomas Drexl, Jean-Marc Le Peuvedic, Eugene Andreeschev, Eric Cheung
- Platforms: GNU/Linux, macOS, Windows
- Release: 2004
- Genre: Combat flight simulator
- Mode: Single-player

GL-117 is a flight simulation and combat video game developed as free software. It was written between 2002 and 2004 in the C++ programming language and was optimized for Nvidia graphics cards. Two years later, due to changes introduced in graphics programming, the graphics engine code had to be rewritten. Its creator abandoned the project upon leaving university, but it was taken up by other developers. Due to its free software nature, the project invites anyone to participate and contribute to it on a voluntary basis. It is available in binary format and source code for the Linux, macOS, and Windows platforms.

The game was reviewed by several international technology magazines, including the Portuguese Revista do CD-ROM in 2004, PC Master magazine, and the Indian technology magazine Digit in 2007.

== Gameplay ==
GL-117 features five predefined levels and a range of view distances. It can be controlled via joystick, mouse, and keyboard. It incorporates music and sound effects. The player can select different combat aircraft, weapons and missions. It makes use of the OpenGL, GLU, GLUT, and SDL libraries. A 3D graphics accelerator with at least 128 MB of RAM is recommended to run it.

== License ==
GL-117 is released under the terms of the GNU General Public License (GPL), version 2 or later.

== Status and forks ==
Although the original project saw no updates for a long period, GL-117's source code continues to be maintained by third-party developers. A fork hosted on Codeberg and distributed via SourceForge, maintained by developer Karl Robillard, has continued active development of the game, including removing the project's dependency on GLUT when built with SDL and releasing new versions such as 1.4. This fork has also been packaged for distributions such as Fedora.
