= Joe's Window Manager =

Logo of JWM

JWM (Joe's Window Manager) is an X11 window manager written in C using Xlib. Its features include a taskbar, an application menu, a clock, and window decorations. JWM supports MWM hints and Extended Window Manager Hints (EWMH) as well as attempts to conform to ICCCM. JWM is licensed under the terms of the Expat license since version 2.3.6. The latest version is JWM v2.4.6. JWM optionally supports the following libraries if installed on the system: libjpeg, libpng, libRSVG, libXext, libXinerama, libXmu, libXpm, and Pango. The official distribution of the software is done in source code form, and is hosted on GitHub. JWM is developed by Joe Wingbermuehle. JWM is configured by editing an XML file located in the file system at ^{/etc/jwm/system.jwmrc} or ^{$HOME/.jwmrc}. It is the default window manager of Puppy Linux and formerly Damn Small Linux.

== See also ==
- Comparison of X window managers
