= Patrick Volkerding =

American software engineer (born 1966)

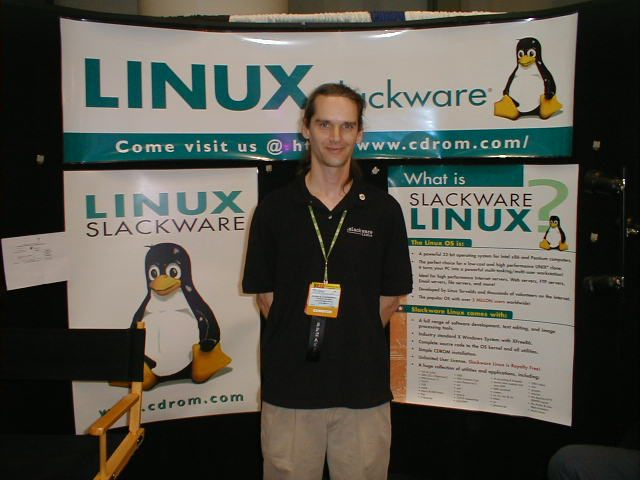
- Patrick Volkerding at Linuxworld 2000 NYC
- Born: Patrick John Volkerding; October 20, 1966 (age 60)
- Education: Minnesota State University Moorhead (BSc)
- Occupation: Software engineer
- Known for: Slackware
- Spouse: Andrea (m. 2001)
- Children: Briah Cecilia Volkerding (b. 2005)
- Parent(s): Dr. John Volkerding & Molly Jane Mullen

Patrick Volkerding (born October 20, 1966) is the founder and maintainer of the Slackware Linux distribution. Volkerding is Slackware's "Benevolent Dictator for Life" (BDFL), and is also known informally as "The Man".

== Personal life ==
Volkerding earned a Bachelor of Science in computer science from Minnesota State University Moorhead in 1993. Volkerding is a Deadhead, and by April 1994 had already attended 75 Grateful Dead concerts.

Volkerding is a Church of the SubGenius affiliate/member. The use of the word slack in "Slackware" is an homage to J. R. "Bob" Dobbs. About the SubGenius influence on Slackware, Volkerding has stated: "I'll admit that it was SubGenius inspired. In fact, back in the 2.0 through 3.0 days we used to print a dobbshead on each CD."

Volkerding is an avid homebrewer and beer lover. Early versions of Slackware would entreat users to send him a bottle of local beer in appreciation for his work.

Volkerding has been married since 2001 to Andrea and has a daughter named Briah Cecilia Volkerding who was born in 2005.

=== Illness ===
In 2004, Volkerding announced via mailing list post that he was suffering from actinomycosis, a serious illness requiring multiple rounds of antibiotics and with an uncertain prognosis. This announcement caused a number of tech news outlets to wonder about the future of the Slackware project. As of 2012, both Volkerding and the Slackware project were reported to be in a healthy state again.

== Slackware Linux ==
Michael Johnston of Morse Telecommunications paid Volkerding $1 per copy sold. After that six-month contract, Robert Bruce of Walnut Creek CDROM began publishing Slackware as a CD-ROM set. Robert Bruce later became Volkerding's partner in Slackware Linux, Inc. with Volkerding owning a non-controlling, minority, 40% share. Due to underpayment, Patrick Volkerding, "told them to take it down or I'd suspend the DNS for the Slackware store".

Walnut Creek CDROM, 60% owner of Slackware Linux, Inc., was sold to BSDi and later to Wind River Systems.

Chris Lumens and others worked for Slackware, but due to underpayment, these people lost their jobs.

From 1993 to present day Volkerding has managed Slackware with the help of many volunteers and testers.

== Awards ==
In 2014, Volkerding received the O'Reilly Open Source Award.

== Works ==
- Volkerding, Patrick, and Reichard, Kevin, Linux System Commands, IDG Books/M&T Books, 2000, ISBN 0-7645-4669-4
- Volkerding, Patrick, Reichard, Kevin, and Foster-Johnson, Eric, Instalación y configuración de Linux, Temas profesionales. Madrid: Anaya Multimedia, 1999 ISBN 84-415-0816-X
- Volkerding, Patrick, Reichard, Kevin, and Foster-Johnson, Eric, LINUX Configuration and Installation, M&T Books, 1998, ISBN 0-7645-7005-6
- Volkerding, Patrick, and Reichard, Kevin, Linux in Plain English, MIS:Press, 1997, ISBN 1-55828-542-3
