= Preseed =

Preseeding is a method for automating the installation of the Debian operating system and its derivatives. Answers to installation questions, which would normally be answered interactively by an operator, are predetermined and supplied via a configuration file (and sometimes boot parameters). This is similar to unattended installations of Windows operating systems using an answer file (see Installation (computer programs)).

Many Debian-based operating systems support preseed, because it is a feature of the Debian-Installer (also known as "d-i"). For instance, although Ubuntu is commonly installed via the user-friendly Ubiquity installer, preseeding the d-i is the recommended method for automating Ubuntu installations and for customizing install CDs.

Note that preseeding automates the operating system installation, but it does not necessarily continue to detailed configuration or application installation in the same way as Fully Automatic Installation

== See also ==
- Redhat's/Fedora Anaconda configuration file kickstart
- Sun's/ Oracle Solaris jumpstart
- System Installer
