= Satellite (software) =

Open source systems management application

- Original author: Red Hat
- Release: 2002; 24 years ago
- Stable release: 6.17 / May 6, 2025; 18 months ago
- Operating system: Linux
- Website: access.redhat.com/products/red-hat-satellite

In computing, Red Hat Satellite is a systems-management product by the company “Red Hat”. It allows system administrators to deploy and manage Red Hat Enterprise Linux (RHEL) hosts.

A Satellite server registers with Red Hat Subscription Management, mirrors all relevant software like security errata and bug fixes, and provides this together with locally added software and configuration to the attached servers.

The managed hosts register against the local Satellite server and access the provided resources like software packages, patches, configuration, etc. while they also provide information about the current health state of the server to the Satellite

As of March 2017:

- The latest version is Red Hat Satellite 6, based on Foreman. This article focuses on Red Hat Satellite 6
- The previous version was Red Hat Satellite 5. Based on Spacewalk, it is still in widespread use despite being in the sunset of its lifecycle

== Architecture ==
=== Red Hat Satellite Server ===
The Red Hat Satellite Server enables planning and management of the content life cycle and the configuration of Capsule Servers and hosts through GUI, CLI (Hammer), or API (RESTful API).

=== Capsule Servers ===
Capsule Servers mirror content from the Satellite Server to establish content sources in different geographical locations, they are analogous to the Red Hat Satellite 5 Proxy Server.

=== Managed Client Systems ===
As well as Supported Managed Hosts Red Hat Satellite 6 also has some deployment and management capability on certain other hosts though Red Hat Support for these will be limited.

=== Connection to Red Hat Customer Portal and External Content Sources ===
Satellite generally operates in "connected" mode, registering directly with the RHN and downloading relevant software into Satellite's software channels. The organisation's hosts then register against the local Satellite server, instead of directly against Red Hat Network.

For secure deployments, Satellite can operate in a "Disconnected" mode, where updates are downloaded directly from Red Hat via an Internet connected machine and then uploaded into Satellite or a local offline RHN proxy.

Both modes allow the organisation to control which versions of software it makes available for its hosts, as well as making additional software available within the local network.

== Red Hat Satellite 6 components ==
Component	Details
The Foreman	Provision and Life Cycle Management of physical and virtual systems
Katello	Foreman Plug-in for Subscription and Repository Management
Candlepin	Service in Katello to handle subscription management
Pulp	Service in Katello to handle repository and content management
Hammer	CLI tool providing command line and shell equivalents of most WEB UI functions
REST API	RESTful API service for System Administrators and Developers to write custom scripts and third party interface applications
Apache Tomcat	Embedded Tomcat server for Web UI and API service connections
Puppet	A Puppet Master server installed as part of a Red Hat Satellite 6 Master Server or Capsule server
Hiera	A Key-Value database that is part of Puppet and helps keep site specific data out of manifests

== Major modules ==
=== Provision ===
Satellite offers numerous methods for deploying hosts, including simple kickstart, bare metal install and re-imaging. Current versions of Satellite support kickstart using Cobbler as an underlying framework. PXE Boot, and Koan are methods that can be used to implement bare metal installs and re-imaging of hosts.

=== Manage ===
Satellite assists in remotely managing hosts in several areas: software, operational management, and configuration. The 3 main mechanisms for managing hosts are:

- Software Channel
- Configuration Channels
- Activation Keys

=== Monitor ===
Satellite can provide monitoring of software and systems via probes. These probes periodically explore the target host and send alerts if the probes do not get the correct replies, or if the replies fall outside of some specified range.

== History and Lifecycle ==
A primary purpose of earlier versions of Satellite was to allow organizations to utilize the benefits of Red Hat Network (RHN) without having to provide public Internet access to their servers or other client systems. Later version of the tool have developed increased functionality.

Satellite version	Release date	End of Full Support	Last minor	Notes release
3	31 August 2005			Initial Red Hat Satellite released.
4	31 August 2005			Red Hat Satellite 4 released.
5	26 June 2007			Red Hat Satellite 5 released. Later donated as open source project upstream for Red Hat Satellite 5.
5.6		31 January 2019		
5.7		31 January 2019		
5.8	20 June 2017	31 May 2020		Last release based on Spacewalk.
6.0	10 September 2014	21 February 2018	6.0.8	Technological base changed towards a combination of the Open Source projects Foreman (Web-Gui, Deployment), Foreman-Katello plugin (Content & Software Management), Puppet (Configuration Management) and others. Spacewalk is no longer upstream for Satellite.
6.1	12 August 2015	30 October 2018	6.1.12	
6.2	25 July 2016	31 May 2019	6.2.16	
6.3	21 February 2018	31 October 2019	6.3.5	This release allows integration with Ansible Tower.
6.4	16 October 2018	30 April 2020	6.4.4	This release has built in Ansible Core, later Puppet 5.
6.5	14 May 2019	Oct 2020	6.5.3	
6.6	22 October 2019	14 May 2021	6.6.3	
6.7	15 April 2020	Oct 2021	6.7.5	With the introduction of Azure provisioning support, you can create a compute resource for Azure and provision new hosts on Azure from the Satellite web UI, API, or Hammer CLI.
6.8	27 October 2020	Jun 2022	6.8.6	
6.9	21 April 2021	Oct 2022	6.9.10	
6.10	16 November 2021	31 May 2023		
6.11	5 July 2022	Jan 2024		Originally planned as version 7 due to removing Puppet. Rebranded to 6.11 after deciding to make Puppet integration optional and disabled by default based on community feedback.
6.12	16 November 2022	May 2024		Removes installation support for Red Hat Enterprise Linux 7
6.13	3 May 2023	Nov 2024		
6.14	8 November 2023	May 2024		
6.15	3 April 2024	Nov 2024		Still requires RHEL 8. RHEL 9 not supported for Satellite
6.16	5 November 2024	May 2025		RHEL 9 supported
6.17	6 May 2025	May 2025		RHEL 9 supported
6.18	6 May 2025	May 2025		RHEL 9 supported RHEL 10 supported Ios Advisor now GA release
Legend: Unsupported Supported Latest version

|-

=== Future of Red Hat Satellite 6 ===
The Lifecycle of Red Hat Satellite 6 is recorded at the Red Hat Satellite and Proxy Server Life Cycle which is updated as required, with future events on a bona fide basis. When viewed in August 2019, Red Hat didn't indicate any date for end of support.

== Red Hat Satellite 5 ==
For Red Hat Satellite version 5 the Satellite Application was implemented by a toolset named Project Spacewalk.

Red Hat announced in June 2008 Project Spacewalk was to be made open source under the GPLv2 License

Satellite 5.3 was the first version to be based on upstream Spacewalk code.

In the Spacewalk FAQ issued in 2015 after the release of Red Hat Satellite 6:

- Red Hat formally released Spacewalk as open source(GPLv2) in June 2008.
- Red Hat would continue to sponsor and support Spacewalk as the upstream Red Hat Satellite 5. however that participation is anticipated to diminish as Red Hat Satellite 5 enters the final phases of its lifecycle. Spacewalk is not and can never be upstream for Red Hat Satellite 6 released in September 2014. due to it being a ground up rebuild with a different toolset.

=== Future of Red Hat Satellite 5 ===
The Lifecycle of Red Hat Satellite 5 is recorded at the Red Hat Satellite and Proxy Server Life Cycle which is updated as required, with future events on a bona fide basis. When viewed in March 2017 Red Hat indicated:

- Red Hat Satellite 5 is in the final Production 3 phase.
- The current releases, 5.6 and 5.7, would remain supported through January 2019.
- A further minor release 5.8 will be the only release supported in a supplementary Extended Life Phase from February 2019 through to EOL in May 2020.

As of April 2017 Satellite minor release 5.8 is in available in beta.

== See also ==
- Landscape (software)
