= Linux distribution =

Operating system based on the Linux kernel

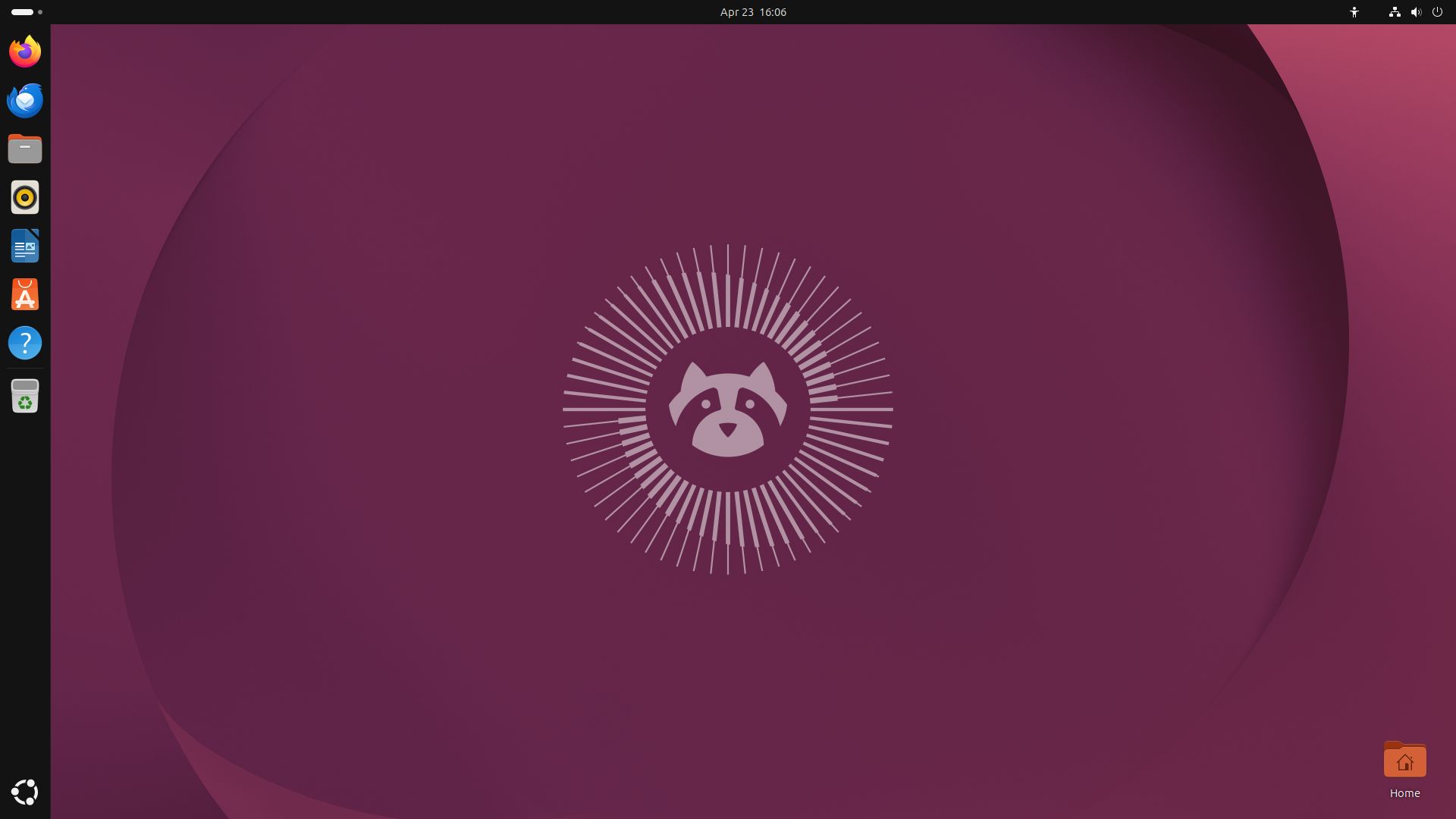
Ubuntu, one of the most popular desktop Linux distributions

A Linux distribution, (Note: Sometimes called a GNU/Linux distribution, with some related controversy) often abbreviated as distro, is an operating system that includes the Linux kernel for its kernel functions. Although the term does not imply product distribution per se, a distro, if distributed on its own, is often obtained via a website intended specifically for the purpose. Distros have been designed for a wide variety of systems ranging from personal computers (for example, Linux Mint) to servers (for example, Red Hat Enterprise Linux) and from embedded devices (for example, OpenWrt) to supercomputers (for example, Rocks Cluster Distribution).

A distro typically includes a Linux kernel and many other components. Commonly, it includes a package manager, an init system (such as systemd, OpenRC, SysVinit, or runit), GNU tools and libraries, documentation, Internet Protocol (IP) network configuration utility software (utilities), the getty TTY setup program, and many more. Programs used to provide a desktop experience (most commonly the Mesa userspace graphics drivers), a display server (the most common being the X.org Server, or, more recently, a Wayland compositor such as Sway, KDE's KWin, or GNOME's Mutter), a desktop environment (most commonly GNOME, KDE Plasma, Cinnamon or Xfce), a sound server (usually either PulseAudio or more recently PipeWire), and other related programs may be included or installed by the user.

Typically, most of the included software is free and open-source software – made available both as binary for convenience and as source code to allow for modifying it. A distro may also include proprietary software that is not available in source code form, such as a device driver binary.

A distro may be described as a specific assortment of application and utility software (various GNU tools and libraries, for example), packaged with the Linux kernel in such a way that its capabilities meet users' needs. The software is usually adapted to the distribution and then combined into software packages by the distribution's maintainers. The software packages are available online in repositories, which are storage locations usually distributed around the world. Beside "glue" components, such as the distribution installers (for example, Debian-Installer and Anaconda) and the package management systems, very few packages are actually written by a distribution's maintainers.

Distributions have been designed for a wide range of computing environments, including desktops, servers, laptops, netbooks, mobile devices (phones and tablets), and embedded systems. There are commercially backed distributions, such as Red Hat Enterprise Linux (Red Hat), openSUSE (SUSE) and Ubuntu (Canonical), and entirely community-driven distributions, such as Debian, Slackware, Gentoo and Arch Linux. Most distributions come ready-to-use and prebuilt for a specific instruction set, while some (such as Gentoo) are distributed mostly in source code form and must be built before installation.

== History ==
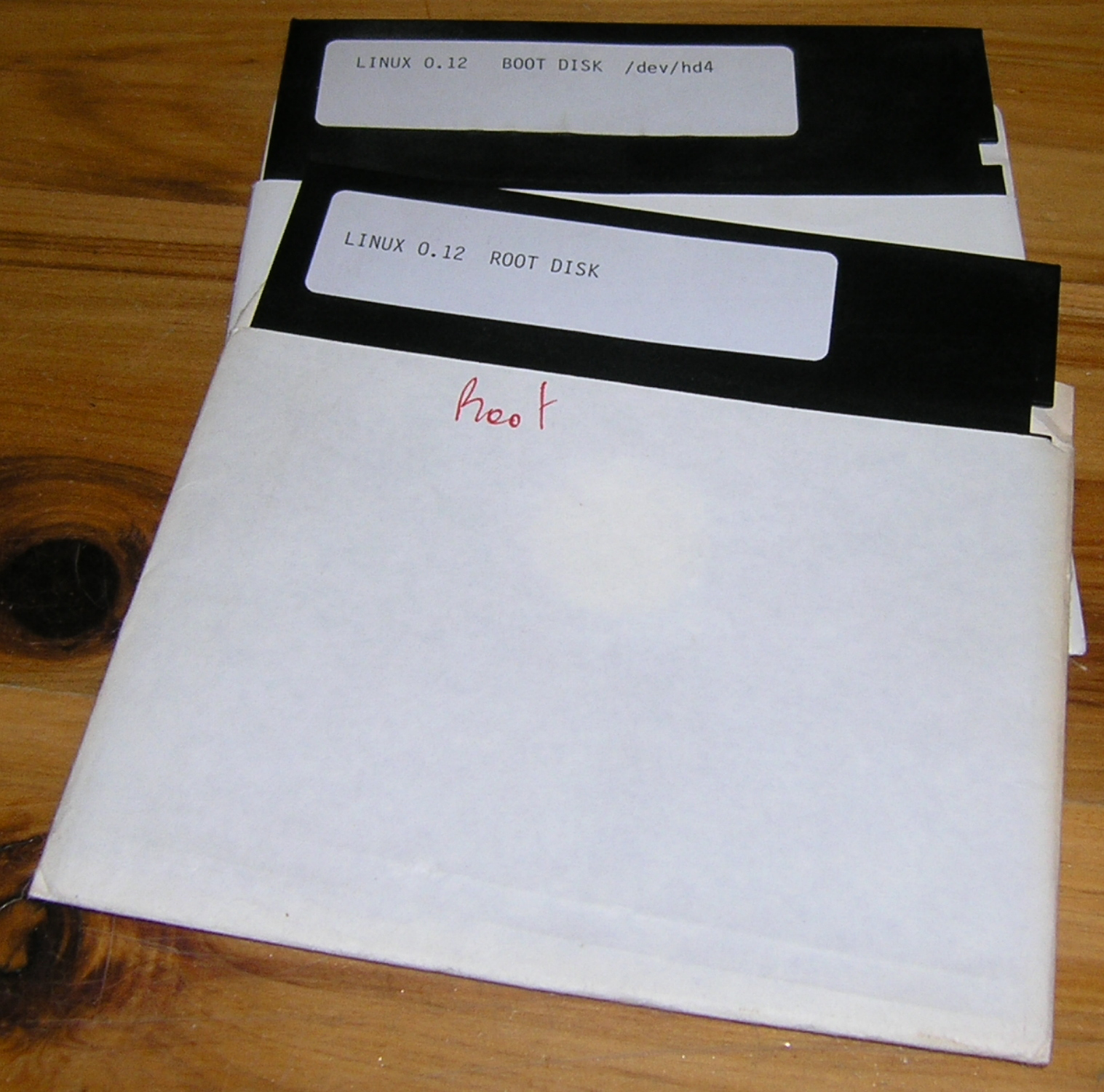
5.25-inch floppy disks holding a very early version of Linux

Timeline of the development of main Linux distributions

Linus Torvalds developed the Linux kernel and distributed its first version, 0.01, in 1991. Linux was initially distributed as source code only, and later as a pair of downloadable floppy disk images: one bootable and holding the Linux kernel, and the other with a set of GNU utilities and tools for setting up a file system. Since the installation procedure was complicated, especially in the face of growing amounts of available software, distributions sprang up to simplify it.

Early distributions included:

- Torvalds' "Boot-Root" images, from v0.95a onwards "Root" was maintained by Jim Winstead Jr., the aforementioned disk image pair with the kernel and the absolute minimal tools to get started (0.10: November 4, 1991)
- MCC Interim Linux (March 3, 1992)
- TAMU Linux, based on MCC with simpler installation and X11 (July 14, 1992)
- Softlanding Linux System (SLS) which included the X Window System and was the most comprehensive distribution for a short time (August 15, 1992)
- H.J. Lu's "bootable rootdisks" (September 23, 1992), and "Linux Base System" (October 5, 1992)
- Yggdrasil Linux/GNU/X, a commercial distribution (alpha: December 8, 1992)

The two oldest, still active distribution projects started in 1993. The SLS distribution was not well maintained, so in July 1993 a new SLS-based distribution, Slackware, was released by Patrick Volkerding. Also dissatisfied with SLS, Ian Murdock set to create a free distribution by founding Debian in August 1993, with first public BETA released in January 1994 and first stable version in June 1996.

Users were attracted to Linux distributions as alternatives to MS-DOS compatible operating systems, Windows, Classic Mac OS, and proprietary versions of Unix. Most early adopters were familiar with Unix from work or school. They embraced Linux distributions for their low (or absent) cost, and the availability of the source code for most or all of their software.

As of November 2026, Linux has become more popular in server and embedded devices markets than in the desktop market. It is used in approximately 63.4% of web servers; its current operating system market share is about 2.15%, (46.71% counting Android). and its desktop operating system market share is about 5.63%.

== Components ==
A Linux distribution is usually built around a package management system, which puts together the Linux kernel, free and open-source software, and occasionally some proprietary software.

Many Linux distributions provide an installation system akin to that provided with other modern operating systems. Other distributions, including Gentoo Linux, provide only the binaries of a basic kernel, compilation tools, and an installer; the installer compiles all the requested software for the specific architecture of the user's computer, using these tools and the software's source code.

=== Package management ===
Distributions are normally segmented into packages. Each package contains a specific application or service. Examples of packages are a library for handling the PNG image format, a collection of fonts, and a web browser.

The package is typically provided as compiled code, with installation and removal of packages handled by a package management system (PMS) rather than a simple file archiver. Each package intended for such a PMS contains meta-information such as its description, version number, and its dependencies (other packages it requires to run). The package management system evaluates this meta-information to allow package searches, perform automatic upgrades to newer versions, and to check that all dependencies of a package are present (and either notify the user to install them, or install them automatically). The package can also be provided as source code to be compiled on the system.

Most distributions install packages, including the kernel and other core operating system components, in a predetermined configuration. A few now require or permit configuration adjustments at first install time. This makes installation less daunting, particularly for new users, but is not always acceptable. For specific requirements, much software must be carefully configured to be useful, to work correctly with other software, or to be secure, and local administrators are often obliged to spend time reviewing and reconfiguring it.

Some (but not all) distributions go to considerable lengths to adjust and customize the software they include, and some provide configuration tools to help users do so.

By obtaining and installing everything normally provided in a distribution, an administrator may create a "distribution less" installation. It is possible to build such systems from scratch, avoiding distributions altogether. One needs a way to generate the first binaries until the system is self-hosting. This can be done via compilation on another system capable of building binaries for the intended target (possibly by cross-compilation). For example, see Linux From Scratch.

== Types and trends ==
In broad terms, Linux distributions may be:

- Commercial or non-commercial
- Designed for enterprise users, power users, or for home users
- Supported on multiple types of hardware, or platform-specific, even to the extent of certification by the platform vendor
- Designed for servers, desktops, or embedded devices
- General purpose or highly specialized toward specific machine functionalities (e.g. firewalls, network routers, and computer clusters)
- Targeted at specific user groups, for example through language internationalization and localization, or through inclusion of many music production or scientific computing packages
- Built primarily for security, usability, portability, or comprehensiveness
- Standard release or rolling release, see below
- Mutable release (the root file system is read-write capable) or immutable release (the root file system is read-only)

The diversity of Linux distributions is due to technical, organizational, and philosophical variation among vendors and users. The permissive licensing of free software means that users with sufficient knowledge and interest can customize any extant distribution, or design one to suit their own needs.

=== Rolling distributions compared to standard releases ===
Rolling Linux distributions are kept current using small and frequent updates. The terms partially rolling and partly rolling (along with synonyms semi-rolling and half-rolling), fully rolling, truly rolling and optionally rolling are sometimes used by software developers and users.

Repositories of rolling distributions usually contain very recent software releases—often the latest stable versions available. They have pseudo-releases and installation media that are simply snapshots of the distribution at the time of the installation image's release. Typically, a rolling-release OS installed from older installation medium can be fully updated after it is installed.

Depending on the usage case, there can be pros and cons to both standard release and rolling release software development methodologies.

In terms of the software development process, standard releases require significant development effort to keep old versions up-to-date by propagating bug fixes back to the newest branch, versus focusing on the newest development branch. Also, unlike rolling releases, standard releases require more than one code branch to be developed and maintained, which increases the workload of the software developers and maintainers.

On the other hand, software features and technology planning are easier in standard releases due to a better understanding of upcoming features in the next version(s). Software release cycles can also be synchronized with those of major upstream software projects, such as desktop environments.

As for the user experience, standard releases are often viewed as more stable and bug-free since software conflicts can be more easily addressed and the software stack more thoroughly tested and evaluated, during the software development cycle. For this reason, they tend to be the preferred choice in enterprise environments and mission-critical tasks.

However, rolling releases offer more current software which can also provide increased stability and fewer software bugs along with the additional benefits of new features, greater functionality, faster running speeds, and improved system and application security. Regarding software security, the rolling release model can have advantages in timely security updates, fixing system or application security bugs and vulnerabilities, that standard releases may have to wait till the next release for or patch in various versions. In a rolling release distribution, where the user has chosen to run it as a highly dynamic system, the constant flux of software packages can introduce new unintended vulnerabilities.

== Installation-free distributions (live CD/USB) ==
A "live" distribution is a Linux distribution that can be booted from removable storage media such as optical discs or USB flash drives, instead of being installed on and booted from a hard disk drive. The portability of installation-free distributions makes them advantageous for applications such as demonstrations, borrowing someone else's computer, rescue operations, or as installation media for a standard distribution.

When the operating system is booted from a read-only medium such as a CD or DVD, any user data that needs to be retained between sessions cannot be stored on the boot device but must be written to another storage device, such as a USB flash drive or a hard disk drive.

Many Linux distributions provide a live form and their conventional form, which is a network-based or removable-media image intended to be used only for installation; such distributions include antiX, SUSE, Ubuntu, Linux Mint, MX Linux and Fedora Linux. Some distributions, including Knoppix, Puppy Linux, Devil-Linux, SuperGamer, SliTaz GNU/Linux and dyne:bolic, are designed primarily for live use. Additionally, some minimal distributions can be run directly from as little space as one floppy disk without the need to change the contents of the system's hard disk drive.

== Examples ==
The website DistroWatch lists many Linux distributions and displays some of the ones that have the most web traffic on the site. The Wikimedia Foundation released an analysis of the browser User Agents of visitors to WMF websites until 2015, which includes details of the most popular Operating System identifiers, including some Linux distributions. Many of the popular distributions are listed below.

=== Widely used distributions ===
- Debian, a non-commercial distribution and one of the earliest, maintained by a volunteer developer community with a strong commitment to free software principles and democratic project management.
- Ubuntu, a desktop and server distribution derived from Debian, maintained by British company Canonical Ltd.
- Linux Mint, a distribution based on and compatible with Ubuntu. Supports multiple desktop environments, among others GNOME Shell fork Cinnamon and GNOME 2 fork MATE.
- Fedora Linux, a community distribution sponsored by American company Red Hat and the successor to the firm's prior offering, Red Hat Linux. It aims to be a technology testbed for Red Hat's commercial Linux offering, where new open-source software is prototyped, developed, and tested in a communal setting before maturing into Red Hat Enterprise Linux.
- openSUSE, a community distribution mainly sponsored by German company SUSE.
- Arch Linux, a rolling release distribution targeted at experienced Linux users and maintained by a volunteer community. Arch Linux offers official binary packages, as well as a wide range of user-submitted source packages, which are usually defined by a single PKGBUILD text file.
- SteamOS, an immutable, gaming-focused Arch-based distro developed by the Valve Corporation and shipped on its Steam Deck, Steam Machine and Steam Frame devices, as well as being available for installation on third-party hardware.
- Gentoo, a distribution targeted at power users, known for its FreeBSD Ports-like automated system for compiling applications from source code.

=== Linux-kernel-based operating systems ===
Several operating systems include the Linux kernel, but have a userland that differs significantly from that of mainstream Linux distributions:

- Android, Google's commercial operating system based on Android OSP that runs on many devices such as smartphones, smart TVs, set-top boxes.
  - There are several third-party distributions of AOSP, in turn, including: LineageOS, GrapheneOS and Android-x86.
- ChromeOS, Google's commercial operating system based on ChromiumOS that only runs on Chromebooks, Chromeboxes and tablet computers. Like Android, it has the Google Play Store and other Google apps. Support for applications that require GNU compatibility is available through a virtual machine called Crostini and referred to by Google as Linux support, see Chromebook § Compatibility with Linux applications (GNU compatibility).

Whether such operating systems count as a "Linux distribution" is a controversial topic. They use the Linux kernel, so the Linux Foundation and Chris DiBona, Google's former open-source chief, agree that Android is a Linux distribution; others, such as Google engineer Patrick Brady, disagree by noting the lack of support for many GNU tools in Android, including glibc.

Other Linux-kernel-based operating systems include Tizen, Mer/Sailfish OS, KaiOS and Amazon's Kindle firmware.

=== Lightweight distributions ===
Lightweight Linux distributions are those that have been designed with support for older hardware in mind, allowing older hardware to still be used productively, or, for maximum possible speed in newer hardware by leaving more resources available for use by applications. Examples include antiX, Damn Small Linux (based on antiX), Tiny Core Linux, Puppy Linux and Slitaz.

=== Niche distributions ===
Other distributions target specific niches, such as:

- Routers – for example OpenWrt
- Microcontrollers with no memory management unit (MMU) – for example μClinux
- Internet of things – for example, targeted by Ubuntu Core and Microsoft's Azure Sphere
- Home theater PCs – for example, targeted by Plasma Bigscreen, KnoppMyth, Kodi (former XBMC) and Mythbuntu
- Specific platforms – for example, Raspberry Pi OS targets the Raspberry Pi platform
- Do it yourself, that is distributions manually built from the ground up, such as Linux From Scratch.
- Education – examples are Edubuntu and Karoshi, server systems based on PCLinuxOS
- Digital audio workstations for music production – for example, targeted by Ubuntu Studio
- Computer security, digital forensics and penetration testing – examples are Kali Linux and Parrot Security OS
- Privacy and anonymity – for example, targeted by Tails, Whonix, Qubes, and FreedomBox
- Offline use – for example, Endless OS
- Gaming – for example, SteamOS
- For smartphones – for example, Mobian

=== Obscure distributions ===
Some distros are lesser-known or known for their quirks, such as:

- Hannah Montana Linux – Aimed to bring Hannah Montana fans to Linux.
- Justin Bieber Linux (or Biebian) – A joke distro that is Justin Bieber themed.
- Red Star OS – North Korean version of Linux.

== Interdistribution issues ==
The Free Standards Group was an organization formed by major software and hardware vendors that aims to improve interoperability between different distributions. Among their proposed standards are the Linux Standard Base, which defines a common ABI and packaging system for Linux, and the Filesystem Hierarchy Standard which recommends a standard file naming chart, notably the basic directory names found on the root of the tree of any Linux file system. Those standards, however, see limited use, even among the distributions developed by members of the organization.

The diversity of Linux distributions means that not all software runs on all distributions, depending on what libraries and other system attributes are required. Packaged software and software repositories are usually specific to a particular distribution, though cross-installation is sometimes possible on closely related distributions.

One of solutions for interdistribution issues, particularly to run software created for a distribution on another, is by using container such as Distrobox.

== Installation ==
There are several ways to install a Linux distribution. The most popular method of installing Linux is by booting from a live USB memory stick, which can be created by using a USB image writer application and the ISO image, which can be downloaded from various Linux distribution websites. DVD disks, CD disks, network installations and even other hard drives can also be used as "installation media".

In the 1990s, Linux distributions were installed using sets of floppy disks, but this has been abandoned by all major distributions. By the 2000s, many distributions offered CD and DVD sets with the vital packages on the first disk and less important packages on later ones. Some distributions, such as Debian also enabled installing over a network after booting from either a set of floppy disks or a CD with only a small amount of data on it.

New users tend to begin by partitioning a hard drive to keep their formerly installed operating system. The Linux distribution can then be installed on its own separate partition without affecting formerly saved data.

In a Live CD setup, the computer boots the entire operating system from CD without first installing it on the computer's hard disk. Many distributions have a Live CD installer, where the computer boots the operating system from the disk, and it can then be installed on the computer's hard disk, providing a seamless transition from the OS running from the CD to the OS running from the hard disk.

Both servers and personal computers that come with Linux already installed are available from vendors including Hewlett-Packard, Dell and System76.

On embedded devices, Linux is typically held in the device's firmware and may or may not be consumer-accessible.

Anaconda, one of the more popular installers, is used by Red Hat Enterprise Linux, Fedora (which uses the Fedora Media Writer) and other distributions to simplify the installation process. Debian, Ubuntu and many others use Debian-Installer.

The process of constantly switching between distributions is often referred to as "distro hopping". Virtual machine (VM) software such as VirtualBox and VMware Workstation virtualize hardware allowing users to test live media on a VM without installing to the real system. Some websites like DistroWatch offer lists of distributions, and link to screenshots of operating systems as a way to get a first impression of various distributions.

=== Installation via an existing operating system ===
Some distributions let the user install Linux on top of their current system, such as Cooperative Linux (coLinux). Linux is installed to the Windows hard disk partition, and can be started from inside Windows.

Virtual machines (such as VirtualBox or VMware Workstation) also make it possible for Linux to be run inside another OS. The VM software simulates a separate computer onto which the Linux system is installed. After installation, the VM can be booted as if it were an independent computer.

Various tools are also available to perform full dual-boot installation from extant platforms with no CD, most notably:

- The (now deprecated) Wubi installer, which allows Windows users to download and install Ubuntu or its derivatives into a File Allocation Table (FAT32) or an NT File System (NTFS) partition with no installation CD, allowing users to easily dual boot between either operating system on the same hard drive without losing data. Replaced by Ubiquity;
- Win32-loader was in the process of being integrated into official Debian CDs/DVDs but has been discontinued. It allowed Windows users to install Debian without a CD, though it performs a network installation and thereby requires repartitioning;
- UNetbootin, which allows Windows and Linux users to perform similar no-CD network installations for a wide variety of Linux distributions and additionally provides live USB creation support.

== Proprietary software ==
Some specific proprietary software products are not available in any form for Linux. As of September 2015, the Steam gaming service has over 1,500 games available on Linux, compared to 2,323 games for Mac and 6,500 Windows games. Emulation and API-translation projects like Wine and CrossOver make it possible to run non-Linux-based software on Linux systems, either by emulating a proprietary operating system or by translating proprietary API calls (e.g., calls to Microsoft's Win32 or DirectX APIs) into native Linux API calls. A virtual machine can also be used to run a proprietary OS (like Microsoft Windows) on top of Linux.

== OEM contracts ==
Pre-built computers are usually sold with an operating system other than Linux already installed by the original equipment manufacturer (OEM). In the case of IBM PC compatibles, the OS is usually Microsoft Windows; in the case of Apple's Mac computers, it has always been macOS; Sun Microsystems sold SPARC hardware with Solaris installed; video game consoles such as the Xbox, PlayStation, Wii, and Nintendo Switch each have their own proprietary OS. This limits Linux's market share: consumers are unaware that an alternative exists, they must make a conscious effort to use a different operating system, and they must either perform the actual installation themselves, or depend on support from a friend, relative, or computer professional.

However, it is possible to buy hardware with Linux already installed. Lenovo, Hewlett-Packard, Dell, Affordy, Purism, Pine64 and System76 all sell general-purpose Linux laptops. Custom-order PC manufacturers will also build Linux systems, but possibly with the Windows key on the keyboard. Fixstars Solutions (formerly Terra Soft) sold Macintosh computers and PlayStation 3 consoles with Yellow Dog Linux installed.

It is more common to find embedded devices sold with Linux as the default manufacturer-supported OS, including the Linksys NSLU2 NAS device, TiVo's line of personal video recorders, and Linux-based cellphones (including Android smartphones), PDAs, and portable music players.

The current Microsoft Windows license lets the manufacturer determine the refund policy. With prior versions of Windows, it was possible to obtain a refund if the manufacturer failed to provide the refund by litigation in the small claims courts. On February 15, 1999, a group of Linux users in Orange County, California held a "Windows Refund Day" protest in an attempt to pressure Microsoft into issuing them refunds. In France, the Linuxfrench and AFUL (French speaking Libre Software Users' Association) organizations along with free software activist Roberto Di Cosmo started a "Windows Detax" movement, which led to a 2006 petition against "racketiciels" (translation: Racketware) with 39,415 signatories and the DGCCRF branch of the French government filing several complaints against bundled software.

== Statistics ==
There are no official figures on the popularity, adoption, downloads or installed base of Linux distributions.

There are also no official figures for the total number of Linux systems, partly due to the difficulty of quantifying the number of PCs running Linux (see Desktop Linux adoption), since many users download Linux distributions. Hence, the sales figures for Linux systems and commercial Linux distributions indicate a much lower number of Linux systems and level of Linux adoption than is the case; this is mainly due to Linux being free and open-source software that can be downloaded free of charge. A Linux Counter Project had kept track of a running guesstimate of the number of Linux systems, but did not distinguish between rolling release and standard release distributions. It ceased operation in August 2018, though a few related blog posts were created through October 2018.

Desktop use statistical reports for many Linux distributions have been collected and published since July 2014 by the Linux Hardware Project.

Statcounter, a web traffic analysis company, within the operating system market share, showed that the Linux operating systems had, according to them, 4.36% of the worldwide market share in June 2026.

== See also ==
- Comparison of Linux distributions
- Light-weight Linux distribution
- List of Linux distributions
