= Spacewalk (software) =

Systems management software

- Original author: Red Hat
- Release: June 2008; 18 years ago
- Final release: 2.10 / March 18, 2020; 6 years ago
- Written in: Java, Perl and Python
- Operating system: Linux
- Available in: English, French, Bengali, Hindi, Japanese, Punjabi, Russian, Simplified Chinese, German, Spanish, Gujarati, Italian, Korean, Brazilian Portuguese, European Portuguese, Tamil, Traditional Chinese
- Type: Systems management
- License: GNU General Public License v2
- Website: spacewalkproject.github.io
- Repository: github.com/spacewalkproject/spacewalk

Spacewalk is open-source systems management software for system provisioning, patching and configuration licensed under the GNU GPLv2.

The project was discontinued on 31 May 2020 with 2.10 being the last official release. SUSE forked the spacewalk code base in 2018 with uyuni-project

== Overview ==
=== Features ===
Spacewalk encompasses the following functions:

- Systems Inventory (Hardware and Software)
- System Software Installation and Updates
- Collation and Distribution of Custom Software Packages into Manageable Groups
- System provisioning (via Kickstart)
- Management and deployment of configuration files
- Provision of virtual Guests
- Start/Stop/Configuration of virtual guests
- OpenSCAP Auditing of client systems

=== Architecture ===
Spacewalk Server: Server represents managing System

- It is possible to set up primary and worker servers, and even a tree setup is possible
- There are options for geographically remote proxy servers

Spacewalk Client: A system managed by a Spacewalk server

- Compatible Client OS's are drawn from:
  - Red Hat Enterprise Linux (RHEL)
    - CentOS
    - Fedora
    - Scientific Linux
    - Oracle Linux (OL)
  - SUSE Linux Enterprise Server (SLES)
    - openSUSE
  - Solaris – limited and deprecated support
  - Debian – limited support

Spacewalk is controlled by the following Interfaces:

- web interface, Used for most interactions
- CLI (Command-line interface), Used for some specific operations
- XML-RPC API, programmatic interface for specialist/development use

Subscription Management:

- Particular upstream and downstream versions may include integration to supported vendor subscription support network such as Red Hat Subscription Management (RHSM), ULN, and SUSE Enterprise Linux Server subscriptions.

Backend Database:

- While formerly requiring the commercial Oracle Database as a backend, version 1.7 (released in March 2012) added support for PostgreSQL.

== Upstream and downstream versions ==
A number of DownStream versions use upstream Spacewalk version as the basis of their System Provision, patch and errata management:

- Red Hat Satellite 5.x
- Oracle's "Spacewalk for Oracle® Linux"
- SUSE Manager Server

Support for particular client OSes, server OSes, system architectures, backend databases, and subscription services varies between versions and releases.

=== Oracle Spacewalk ===
Oracle introduced their own version of Spacewalk particularly to provide a familiar alternative for those switching from a different vendor while Oracle Enterprise Manager remains Oracle Corporation's preferred way of managing systems.

Spacewalk for Oracle® Linux is designed to be hosted on Oracle Linux (OL).

| Oracle Spacewalk Release | Date | Upstream Release | Server Versions | Client Versions | Features |
|---|---|---|---|---|---|
| 2.0 | November 2013 | 2.0 | OL 6 | OL 5, OL 6 | First Oracle Spacewalk Release |
| 2.2 | January 2015 | 2.2 | OL 6 | OL 5, OL 6, OL 7 | New features related to upstream Spacewalk 2.2 |
| 2.4 | April 2016 | 2.4 | OL 6, OL 7 | OL 5, OL 6, OL 7 | Oracle Linux 7 supported |
| 2.6 | May 2017 | 2.6 | OL 6, OL 7 | OL 5, OL 6, OL 7 | taskotop monitor utility and removal of system and software channel entitlements |
| 2.7 | April 2018 | 2.7 | OL 6, OL 7 | OL 5, OL 6, OL 7 | jabberd, deprecated jPackage libraries, and further enhancements |
| 2.10 | August 2020 | 2.10 | OL 7 | OL 5, OL 6, OL 7, OL 8 | Oracle Linux 8 supported |

The about section of the release notes in Oracle Spacewalk 2.x Documentation indicate only minor branding changes and changes for GPG keys

=== Red Hat Satellite 5 ===
Red Hat Satellite 5 is a licensed downstream adaption of Spacewalk with added functionality to manage Red Hat Enterprise Linux Subscriptions. In the active years of the Red Hat Satellite 5 lifecycle Spacewalk was simply known as the upstream project for Satellite. The relationship between Spacewalk and Red Hat Satellite 5 was analogous to the relationship between Fedora and Red Hat Enterprise Linux. With the emergence of Red Hat Satellite 6 with based on a fundamentally different toolset, end of lifecycle phase of Red Hat Satellite 5 and the emergence of downstream spacewalk based offerings from Oracle and SUSE newer versions of Spacewalk may not have this close relationship.

=== SUSE Manager Server ===
In March 2011 Novell released SUSE Manager 1.2, based on Spacewalk 1.2 and supporting the management of both SUSE Linux Enterprise and Red Hat Enterprise Linux.

In May 2018, during the openSUSE conference in Prague, it was announced that a fork of Spacewalk, called Uyuni, was being created. Named after the salt flat in Bolivia, Uyuni uses Salt for configuration management and React as the user interface framework.

From version 4.0, SUSE Manager is based on Uyuni as its upstream project.

== History and development ==
=== Development ===
Red Hat developed the Red Hat Network to manage subscriptions software management and created the Red Hat Satellite application as a central management point with the user network.

For Red Hat Satellite version 5 the Satellite Function was implemented by a toolset named Project Spacewalk.

Red Hat announced in June 2008 Project Spacewalk was to be made open source under the GPLv2 License

Satellite 5.3 was the first version to be based on upstream Spacewalk code.

=== Stewardship and governance ===
In the Spacewalk FAQ issued in 2015 after the release of Red Hat Satellite 6 Red Hat.

- Red Hat formally released Spacewalk as open source(GPLv2) in June 2008
- Red Hat continues to sponsor and support Spacewalk as the upstream Red Hat Satellite 5. However that participation is anticipated to diminish as Red Hat Satellite 5 enters the final phases of its lifecycle. Spacewalk is not and can never be upstream for Red Hat Satellite 6 released in September 2014 due to it being a ground up rebuild with a different toolset.
- The Spacewalk project can continue to grow and flourish provided that the community continues to find it a useful tool and is willing to support it.

Satellite 5 went end-of-life on 31 May 2020, the Spacewalk project was discontinued at the same time.

== Builds ==
=== Upstream build ===
==== Releases ====
| Release | Release Date | Server Version (Note: Fedora server version, see release note for other Linux distributions) | Selected features and notes |
|---|---|---|---|
| 2.10 | March 18, 2020 | 30, 31 | Installable on Fedora 30 and 31, bugfix release - Last official release |
| 2.9 | January 14, 2019 | 27, 28, 29 | Installable on Fedora 29 and can distribute RHEL 8 Beta |
| 2.8 | April 19, 2018 | 26, 27, 28 | Support PostgresSQL 10 |
| 2.7 | September 26, 2017 | 24, 25, 26 | Taskomatic daemon monitor |
| 2.6 | November 29, 2016 | 23, 24 | Can sync to Debian/Ubuntu apt repositories |
| 2.5 | June 8, 2016 | 22, 23 | System entitlements and Software Channels entitlements removed |
| 2.4 | October 7, 2015 | 21, 22 | More Standardization on PatternFly User Interface |
| 2.3 | April 14, 2015 | 20, 21 | Solaris support removed |
| 2.2 | July 16, 2014 | 19, 20 | RHEL7 and CentOS 7 clients supported |
| 2.1 | March 4, 2014 | 19, 20 | Final Release installable to RHEL 5. Improved OpenSCAP integration. |
| 2.0 | July 19, 2013 | 18, 19 | Support for external PostgreSQL database |
| 1.9 | March 5, 2013 | 17, 18 | New reports |
| 1.8 | November 1, 2012 | 16, 17 | Integration with SUSE Studio |
| 1.7 | March 7, 2012 | 15, 16 | OpenSCAP integration |
| 1.6 | December 22, 2011 | 15, 16 | Support for Kickstart Proxy via a CNAME |
| 1.5 | July 21, 2011 | 14, 15 | AutoYaST Support |
| 1.4 | April 26, 2011 | 13, 14 | apt-get plug-in support |
| 1.3 | February 4, 2011 | 13, 14 | |
| 1.2 | November 19, 2010 | 12, 13, 14 | |
| 1.1 | August 13, 2010 | 12, 13 | |
| 1.0 | April 29, 2010 | 11, 12 | Script for re-configuring server |
| 0.8 | February 16, 2010 | 11, 12 | Support for packages using checksums other than MD5 |
| 0.7 | December 4, 2009 | 11, 12 | |
| 0.6 | August 7, 2009 | 10, 11 | Yum repo can be imported into a channel |
| 0.5 | March 31, 2009 | 10 | |
| 0.4 | January 15, 2009 | | Integration with Cobbler and Koan |
| 0.3 | November 7, 2008 | | |
| 0.2 | September 16, 2008 | | Release Announcement |
| first | June 17, 2008 | | Initial Release Announcement |

== Criticisms ==
In a 2019 paper considering Linux open-source patching tools, Spacewalk was commended for having a software inventory and community support but limited support for distributions; notably, Ubuntu was an issue.

== Miscellaneous ==
- The Spacewalk logo is a trademark of Red Hat, Inc.

== Note ==
| Resource | Notes |
|---|---|
| Project GitHub Home | GitHub Root |
| GitHub Wiki | Forced move from Fedorahosted.org TRAC from late 2016 and as of February 2017 may have some link discrepancies remaining |
| Official Project Home | Domain Registered by Red Hat but not updated since 2015 (accessed January 2017) |
| User Documentation | User Documentation |
| FAQ | Upstream FAQ |
| Deprecated FedoraHosted Wiki | Deprecated |
