= RHN =

RHN could mean:

- Red Hat Network, a software update service for Red Hat Linux
- Northern Rhodesia, an historical territory in south central Africa
- Royal Hospital for Neuro-disability
