= Shell account =

User account on a remote server

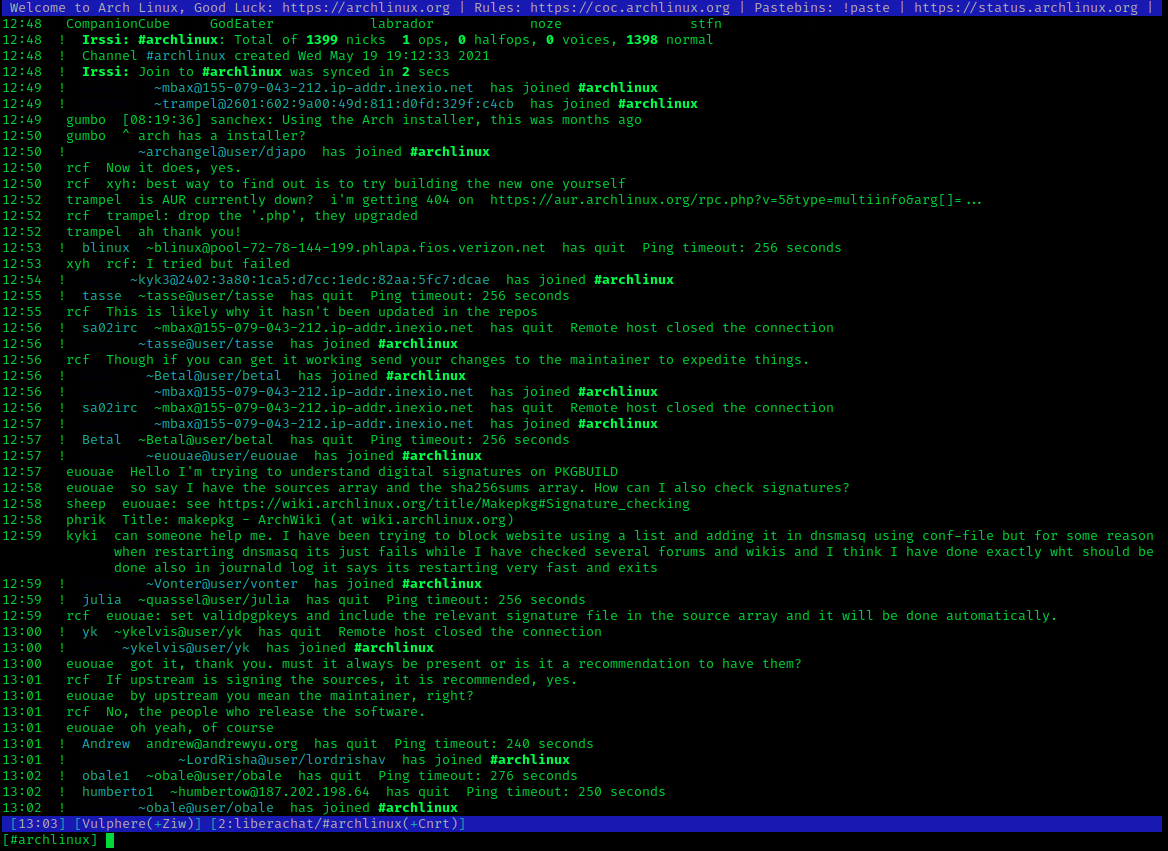
irssi IRC client running on a shell server

A shell account is a user account on a remote server, typically running under Unix or Linux operating systems. The account gives access to a text-based command-line interface in a shell, via a terminal emulator. The user typically communicates with the server via the SSH protocol. In the early days of the Internet, one would connect using a modem.

Shell accounts were first made accessible in the 1980s to interested members of the public by Internet Service Providers—such as Netcom, Panix, The World, and Digex—although in rare instances individuals had access to shell accounts through their employer or university. They were used for file storage, web space, email accounts, newsgroup access and software development. Before the late 1990s, shell accounts were often much less expensive than full net access through SLIP or PPP, which was required to access the then-new World Wide Web. Most personal computer operating systems also lacked TCP/IP stacks by default before the mid-1990s. Products such as The Internet Adapter were devised that could work as a proxy server, allowing users to run a web browser for the price of a shell account.

While direct internet connections made shell accounts largely obsolete for most users, they remained popular with some technically inclined subscribers.

Shell providers are often found to offer shell accounts at low-cost or free. These shell accounts generally provide users with access to various software and services including compilers, IRC clients, background processes, FTP, text editors (such as nano) and email clients (such as pine). Some shell providers may also allow tunneling of traffic to bypass corporate firewalls.

== See also ==
- Bulletin board system
- Free-net
- SDF Public Access Unix System, one of the oldest and largest non-profit public access UNIX systems on the Internet.
- Slirp, a free software application similar to The Internet Adapter
- SSH tunneling
- The Big Electric Cat was a public access computer system in New York City in the late 1980s, known on Usenet as node dasys1.
- The Internet Adapter, a graphical application front end for internet access using shell accounts allowing TCP/IP-based applications such as Netscape to run over the shell account.
- The WELL, best known for its Internet forums, but also provides email, shell accounts, and web pages.
