= TopologiLinux =

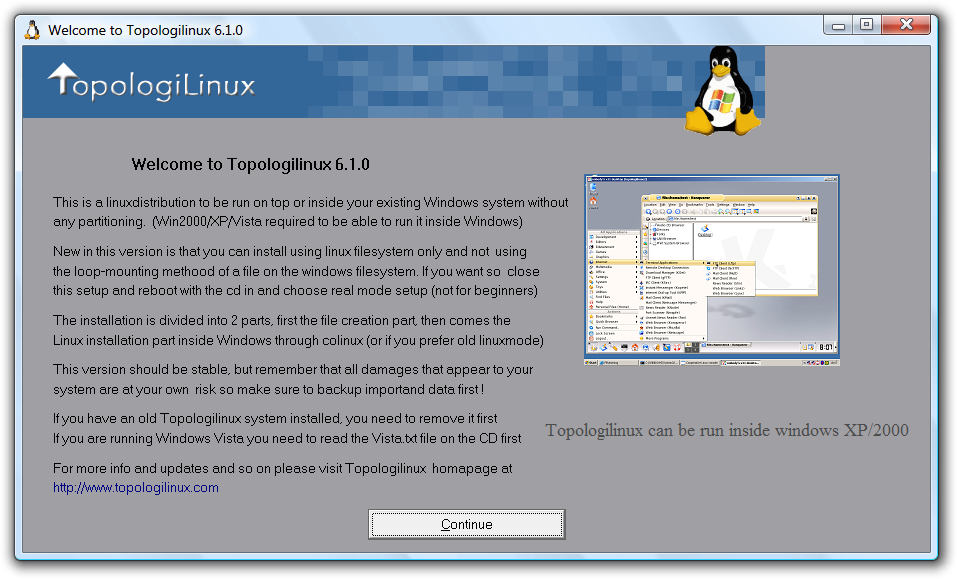
- TopologiLinux Installation under Windows Vista
- OS family: Linux (Unix-like)
- Initial release: 25 August 2002; 22 years ago
- Final release: 7.0.1 / 10 January 2009; 16 years ago
- Available in: English
- License: GNU General Public License v2.0
- Official website: web.archive.org/web/20090210195623/http://topologilinux.com/ (Archived)

TopologiLinux is a free Linux distribution to be run on an existing Microsoft Windows system. The main feature of TopologiLinux is that it does not require any partitioning. It is based on Slackware and Cooperative Linux (coLinux). TopologiLinux has been chosen as one of nine open-source projects used as principal examples in a study of the characteristics of open-source software (Gacek and Budi 2004).

== Usage ==
TopologiLinux creates one hard disk image and other related files in a directory "/tlinux*" (where * represents the version number of TopologiLinux) on a chosen drive using Windows. TopologiLinux cannot be set up through DOS. The user may boot the system through coLinux on Windows or directly on the computer by booting with the TopologiLinux disc.

== Storage system ==
TopologiLinux creates a hard disk image file on an NTFS or FAT partition.

== Usage on Windows ==
TopologiLinux uses coLinux to run on Windows; because of the cooperative design of coLinux, it is possible to work on Windows and Linux side by side.

== See also ==
- Wubi (installer)
- Paravirtualization
- Comparison of platform virtualization software
