= Foresight Linux =

Foresight
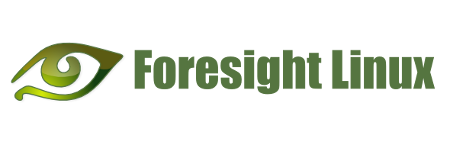

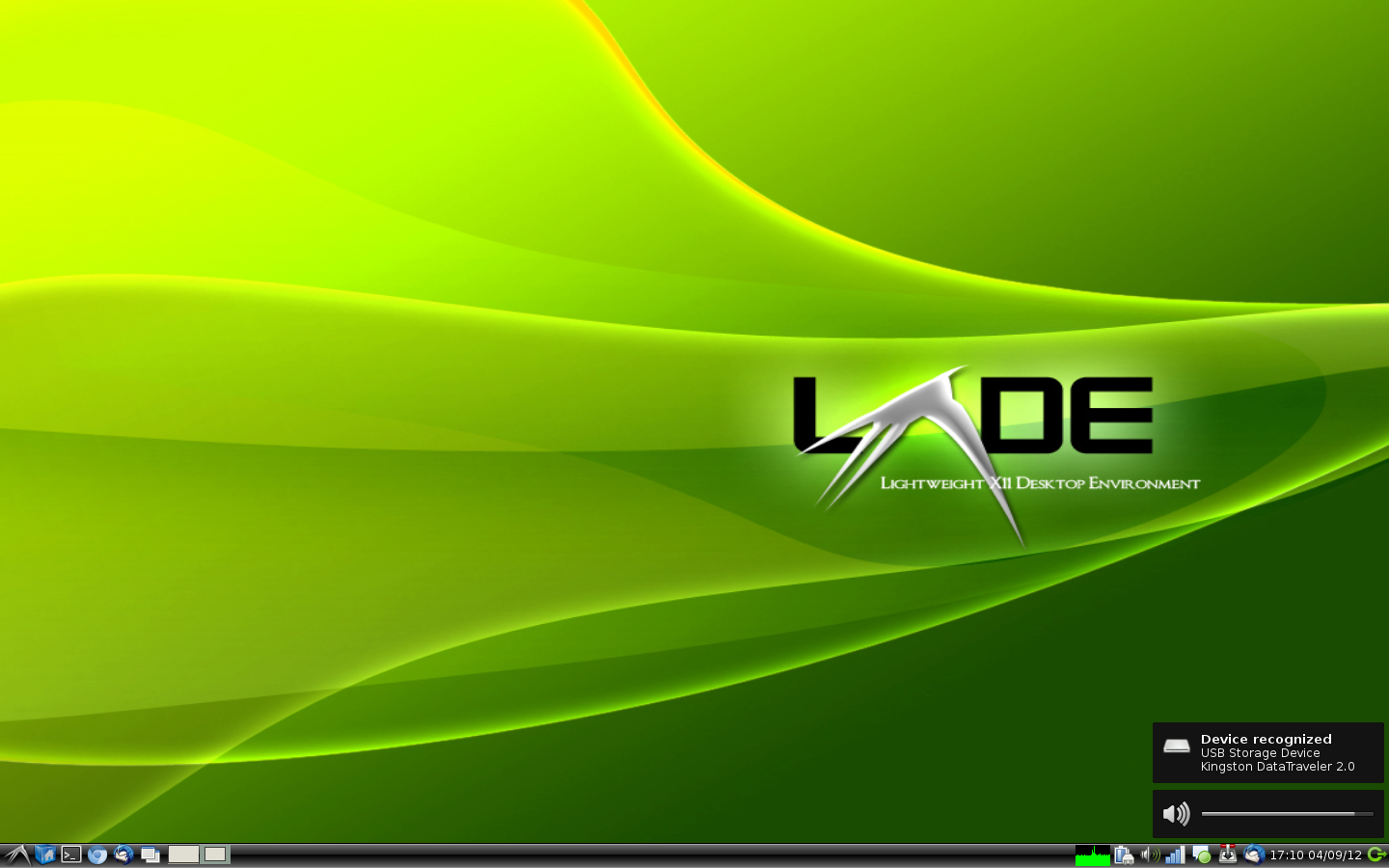
- The Foresight Linux 2.5.2 desktop with LXDE
- Developer: Foresight Community
- OS family: Linux (Unix-like)
- Working state: Discontinued
- Source model: Mixed source
- Latest release: (Rolling release) 2.5.3 / April 12, 2013; 13 years ago
- Update method: PackageKit (gnome-packagekit)
- Package manager: Conary
- Supported platforms: IA-32, x86-64
- Kernel type: Monolithic (Linux)
- Default user interface: GNOME, KDE, LXDE, Xfce
- Official website: https://www.foresightlinux.org

Foresight Linux was a Linux distribution comprising free and proprietary software with the goal of showcasing the latest in Linux desktop technologies. Foresight was developed by the Foresight community and is based on rPath, it also follows a rolling release cycle, instead of a time-based release schedule.

The project announced it was shutting down at the end of May 2015.

== History ==
Foresight was created by Ken VanDine as a Linux distribution to showcase the most current releases of GNOME while working on the GNOME Marketing team.

Since then it has undergone change through generally minor revisions (via rolling release). This is in contrast to the system of major changes with each version number employed by many other distributions. However, there have been occasional major changes, most notably the transition from Foresight 1.x to Foresight 2. Along the way several original deficiencies have been cured as well, among them the lack of 64 bit support, which was introduced in Foresight 2, and the lack of a graphical package manager, which was filled by PackageKit.

After the release of Foresight 2, the developers held a packaging contest within the community in order to boost the number of applications available for the new release, either by porting them from Foresight 1, or packaging them afresh. The contest was sponsored by Shuttle Inc., Foresight's OEM partner, in the form of computers (Shuttle's KPC) and peripherals for the winners. Though originally planned to last one month, the contest was extended to two near the end of the first so that a greater number of packages could be completed. The process of testing all of the completed packages is currently underway, and no official announcements have been made as to the winner.

While originally a GNOME-based distribution, from version 2.5.0 Xfce and KDE desktops have been introduced.

Foresight was the recipient of the Ovatio Award for 2008 Distro of the Year by Ars Technica.

== Features ==
Foresight focuses on delivering the latest in desktop technologies. It usually has current packages for the GNOME desktop environment, sometimes even within a day of their release. Projects such as GNOME Do, Banshee and PackageKit are delivered in the default Foresight installation. Beyond the existing GNOME Edition, Xfce and KDE Editions are available. These two editions have the same focus of delivering the latest desktop technologies for the respective desktop environments.

Foresight uses the Conary package management system. This system only updates those specific files in packages which need to be updated, in contrast to other package managers such as RPM and dpkg which install whole packages. Conary also has the advantage of very granular dependency resolution, and a relatively easy packaging process, with repositories provided to the community, free of charge, by rPath, Inc.

All packages are updated in a rolling release style, i.e. as updates are released upstream, or packagers get to them. Packages move between three branches of the foresight repositories, originating usually at the development branch or in the personal repositories of packagers, after which they are promoted to the Quality Assurance branch, and finally to the Stable branch, intended for users. Snapshots are taken every few months, and new ISO images are produced.

== Vendor support ==
Foresight used to be available pre-installed on the Shuttle's light-weight KPC system.
