= MacVTap =

MacVTap is a Linux kernel device driver that facilitates virtualized bridged networking. Typically, it is used in virtualized environments to make both the guest and the host show up directly on the network switch the host is connected to, and to improve throughput and latencies to external systems.

== See also ==
- TUN/TAP
