= Network Installation Manager =

Network Installation Manager (NIM) is an object-oriented system management framework on the IBM AIX operating system that installs and manages systems over a network. NIM is analogous to Kickstart in the Linux world. NIM is a client-server system in which a NIM server provides a boot image to client systems via the BOOTP and TFTP protocols. In addition to boot images, NIM can manage software updates and third-party applications. The SUMA command can be integrated with NIM to automate system updates from a central server and subsequent distribution to clients.

NIM data is organized into object classes and object types. Classes include machines, networks and resources while types refer to the kind of object within a class, e.g., script or image resources.
