= Fully Automatic Installation =

Rapid installer for Linux distributions

Fully Automated Installation (FAI) is a group of shell and Perl scripts that install and configure a complete Linux distribution quickly on a large number of computers. It's the oldest automated deployment system for Debian.

== Automation ==
FAI allows for installing Debian and Ubuntu distributions. But it also supports CentOS, Rocky Linux and SuSe Linux. In the past it supported Scientific Linux CERN. By default a network installation is done, but it's easy to create an installation ISO for booting from CD or USB stick.

There's a web service for FAI which is called FAI.me, which allows creating customized installation images without setting up your own FAI server. This service also creates cloud images and live images

This service supports Debian and Ubuntu. Debian's cloud team uses FAI for creating their official cloud images.

Similar software exists for Red Hat (Kickstart), SuSE (AutoYaST, YaST and alice), Solaris (Jumpstart) and likely other operating systems.
