= Panix (ISP) =

Panix Public Access Networks Corporation
- Founded: 1989
- Founders: Alexis Rosen & Jim Baumbach
- Headquarters: New York City, New York, USA
- Services: Community/Social Networking; ISP

Panix is an internet service provider. The third-oldest ISP in the world after The World and NetCom, it originally ran on A/UX on an Apple Macintosh IIfx. Panix has gone through a number of transitions as the Internet has grown. It maintains a vibrant community of shell users and posters to its private panix.* USENET newsgroups.

Panix was started as a commercial venture to fill the void created after New York City's primary USENET connected public access system (which was donation supported), The Big Electric Cat, ceased operations. Today, Panix is a full-service provider, offering V-Colo virtual personal servers (VPS), mailboxes and other email services, assorted domain services, web hosting, real and virtual colocation, Internet access (T3s, T1s, SDSL, ADSL, and national dialup), and web programming and network consulting services. Panix also specializes in Unix shell access, from anywhere on the Internet, anywhere in the world.

Panix is a vocal supporter of free speech and uncensored internet access.

== Network security incidents ==
Panix was one of the first sites to identify the 1996 SYN flood Denial of service.

In 2005, the "panix.com" domain name was hijacked over a (US) long holiday weekend.
