= The Internet Adapter =

Software to allow SLIP connections over a shell account

The Internet Adapter (TIA) was software created by Cyberspace Development in 1993 to allow Serial Line Internet Protocol (SLIP) connections over a shell account. Point-to-Point Protocol (PPP) was added in 1995, by which time the software was marketed and sold by Intermind of Seattle. Shell accounts normally only allow the use of command line or text-based software, but by logging into a shell account and starting the TIA daemon, a user could then run any TCP/IP-based application, including standard GUI software such as the then-popular Netscape Navigator on their computer. This was especially useful at the time because simple shell accounts were much less expensive than full SLIP/PPP accounts. TIA was ported to a large number of unix or unix-like systems.

Usage of TIA declined rapidly with the advent of inexpensive PPP-enabled consumer-level dial-up access. Also, competition from alternatives such as the free software Slirp cut its market share. Cyberspace Development later sold its domain name and its owners went on to other projects while Intermind moved on to Push technology and automated data delivery.
