= Side effect (disambiguation) =

A side effect is an effect that is secondary to the one intended.

Side effect or side effects may also refer to:

- Side effect (computer science), a state change caused by a function or expression
- Side effect (medicine), an unintended effect of the use of a drug

== Media ==
- Side Effects (Allen book), a 1986 collection of short stories by Woody Allen
- Side Effects (TV series), a 1994 Canadian TV series
- "Side Effects" (Ben 10 episode), a 2006 episode of television series Ben 10
- Side Effects (Bass book), a 2008 nonfiction book by Alison Bass

== Film ==
- Side Effects (2005 film), starring Katherine Heigl
- Side Effects (2013 film), directed by Steven Soderbergh
- The Side Effect, a 2014 film directed by Ti West
- Side Effects, an Indian romcom film series, including
  - Pyaar Ke Side Effects (2006)
  - Shaadi Ke Side Effects (2014)

== Music ==
=== Bands ===
- Side Effect (band), a 1972–1982 American disco and jazz-funk band
- The Side Effects (band), a 1980–1982 American indie rock band

=== Albums ===
- Side Effect (album), by Side Effect, 1975
- Side Effects (Dallas Smith album) or the title song (see below), 2016
- The Side Effects (album), by Coldrain, or the title song, 2019
- Side Effects (EP), by Mads Langer and Tim Christensen, or the title song, 2014
- Side Effects, by White Denim, 2019

=== Songs ===
- "Side Effects" (The Chainsmokers song), 2018
- "Side Effects" (Dallas Smith song), 2016
- "Side Effects" (Mariah Carey song), 2008
- "Side Effects", by Becky Hill from Believe Me Now?, 2024
- "Side Effects", by Carlie Hanson, 2019
- "Side Effects", by Mimi Webb from Confessions, 2025
- "Side Effects", by Stray Kids from Clé 2: Yellow Wood, 2019
- "Side Effects", by Ty Dolla Sign from Beach House 3, 2017

== See also ==
- Side product
- Side reaction
- By-product
- Causality
- Unintended consequences
