= FreeLAN =

VPN software

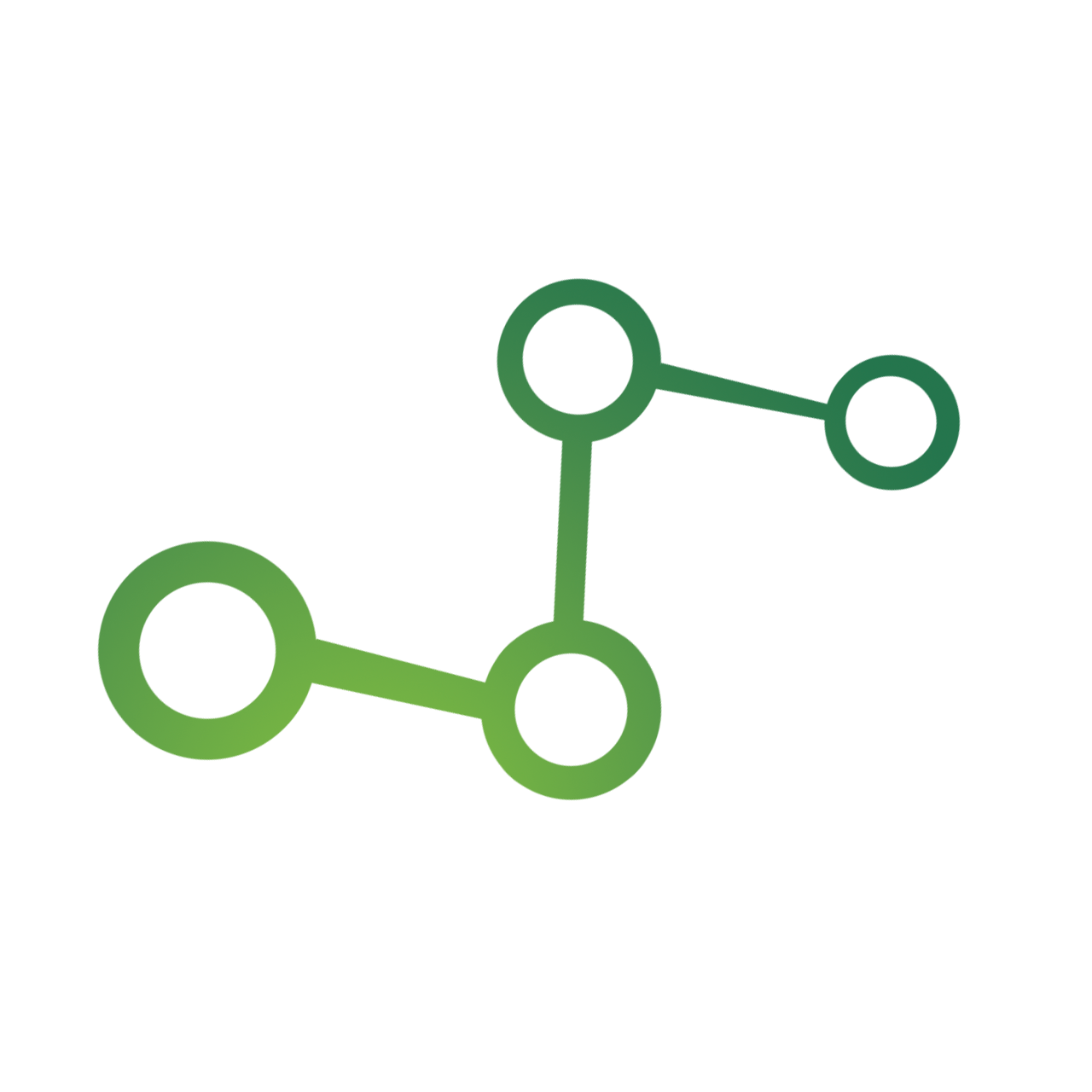
- Developer(s): Julien Kauffmann
- Initial release: 1.1 / October 1, 2013; 11 years ago
- Stable release: 2.2 / 7 May 2019; 5 years ago
- Repository: github.com/freelan-developers/freelan
- Written in: C++
- Type: VPN
- License: GNU GPLv3
- Website: freelan.org

FreeLAN is computer software that implements peer-to-peer, full mesh, virtual private network (VPN) techniques for creating secure point-to-point or site-to-site connections in routed or bridged configurations and remote access facilities. It is free and open-source software licensed under the GNU General Public License Version 3 (GNU GPLv3).

== Encryption ==
FreeLAN uses the OpenSSL library to provide encryption of both the data and control channels. It lets OpenSSL do all the encryption and authentication work, allowing FreeLAN to use all the ciphers available in the OpenSSL package.

== Authentication ==
FreeLAN has several ways to authenticate peers with each other. From version 2.0 FreeLAN offers pre-shared keys, certificate-based, and username-password based authentication.
