= JumpStart (software) =

Computer network installation tool

JumpStart is a computer network installation tool set, created by Thomas Fritz in 1994 at Sun, used by the Solaris operating system.

== Usage ==
JumpStart is used to manage operating system installation in many Information technology environments (corporate and otherwise) where Solaris operating system computers are widely used. It can provide easier installation (minor setup on central server, then one command on an installation "client" system to start it installing). It also allows completely consistent system installation on many systems over time - each install can have exactly the same system configuration and software tools. Alternatively, different types of systems can be installed for different purposes, in each case with consistent installations for a given defined type. Tools used to manipulate JumpStart include JET, the JumpStart Enterprise Toolkit.

== Structure ==
JumpStart consists of two main parts: network booting of a system, and then network installation.

Network booting proceeds similarly to Solaris' standard network booting capabilities. A JumpStart and network booting server is set up on the same local network as the system(s) to be installed. Technically, the network boot and install servers can be separate functions, but they are typically the same system.

Once a client system begins the JumpStart process, it then accesses the operating system component software packages stored on the JumpStart server, usually but not exclusively using Network File System.

Those packages, and optionally additional tools or applications, are automatically installed, and then the system is rebooted. Some additional configuration may be manually performed, or the system's configuration may be set up completely automatically.

== See also ==
- Kickstart (Linux)
- Fully Automatic Installation
- System Installer
