= The Big Electric Cat =

The Big Electric Cat, named for an Adrian Belew song, was a public access computer system in New York City in the late 1980s, known on Usenet as node dasys1.

Based on a Stride Computer brand minicomputer running the UniStride Unix variant, the Big Electric Cat (sometimes known as BEC) provided dialup modem users with text terminal-based access to Usenet at no charge.

This was the first such system in New York and one of the first in the world. Previously, access to Usenet had been almost exclusively through systems at universities, or a few government and very few commercial installations. While Bulletin Board System culture and Fidonet existed at the time, systems which allowed the general public to access Usenet were virtually unknown. As with many early Internet and Usenet systems, a community began to form among users of the system which had occasional outings to restaurants.

== History ==
BEC was started by four college students, with one of them, Rob Sweeney, owning the equipment. The other sysops were Charles Foreman, Lee Fischman, and Richard Newman.

A list of BBSes in the 212 Area Code contains the following note, attributed to Lee Fischman

I was one of the sysops. Originally we were set up (illicitly) in the computer room of a midtown advertising agency. It is a VERY amusing story -- pity you didn't know about it before the movie! We eventually migrated to the offices of a communications firm elsewhere in the city. I still have the Big Electric Cat user manual, with its very entertaining cover. Robert Sweeney was killed in a motorcycle accident in 2001.

The movie referred to is BBS: The Documentary.

BEC was not intended to be a profit-making operation, charging fees that were designed only to cover operating costs, (Phrack reports $5 per month for an account at the end of 1989, though the system may have in fact been out of operation by then, and other sources note that the system was supported by donations) and relying entirely on volunteer labor.

In mid-1990, after increasingly unreliable operation, The Big Electric Cat suffered what proved to be fatal hardware failure, leaving a gap which was filled by some its users founding one of the first commercial ISPs ever, Panix.

2600 Magazine founder Eric Corley used a Big Electric Cat account.
