= Kickstart (Linux) =

Automatic operating system installation method

The Red Hat Kickstart installation method is used by Fedora, Red Hat Enterprise Linux and related Linux distributions to automatically perform unattended operating system installation and configuration. Red Hat publishes Cobbler as a tool to automate the Kickstart configuration process.

== Usage ==
Kickstart is normally used at sites with many such Linux systems, to allow easy installation and consistent configuration of new computer systems.

Kickstart configuration files can be built three ways:

1. By hand.
2. By using the GUI system-config-kickstart tool.
3. By using the standard Red Hat installation program Anaconda.

Anaconda will produce an anaconda-ks.cfg configuration file at the end of any manual installation. This file can be used to automatically reproduce the same installation or edited (manually or with system-config-kickstart).

== Structure ==
The kickstart file is a simple text file, containing a list of items, each identified by a keyword.

While not strictly required, there is a natural order for sections that should be followed. Items within the sections do not have to be in a specific order unless otherwise noted. The section order is:

- Command section – single line general purpose commands.
- The %packages section – listing of software packages to be installed & related options.
- The %pre, %pre-install, %post, %onerror, and %traceback sections – can contain scripts that will be executed at the appropriate time during the installation.

The %packages, %pre, %pre-install, %post, %onerror, and %traceback sections are all required to be closed with %end.

Items that are not required for the given installation run can be omitted.

Lines starting with a pound sign (#) are treated as comments and are ignored.

If deprecated commands, options, or syntax are used during a kickstart installation, a warning message will be logged to the anaconda log. Since deprecated items are usually removed within a release or two, it makes sense to check the installation log to make sure you haven’t used any of them. When using ksvalidator, deprecated items will cause an error.

== Example ==
A simple Kickstart for a fully automated Fedora installation.

# use Fedora mirror as installation source, set Fedora version and target architecture
url --mirrorlist=http://mirrors.fedoraproject.org/mirrorlist?repo=fedora-33&arch=x86_64

# set installation language
lang en_US.UTF-8

# set keyboard
keyboard us

# set root password
rootpw 12345

# create a sudo capable user
user --name wikipedia-user --password 12345 --groups=wheel

#set timezone
timezone America/New_York

# clear all existing storage (!)
zerombr
clearpart --all --initlabel

# automatically create default storage layout
autopart

%packages
# install the Fedora Workstation environment
@^Fedora Workstation
# install some package groups
@3D Printing
@C Development Tools and Libraries
@System Tools
# install some packages
vim
git
mc
%end

== See also ==
- AutoYaST (SUSE)
- Fully Automatic Installation (FAI) – Debian, Ubuntu, CentOS, SUSE
- System Installer
- JumpStart (software)
- Network Installation Manager
- Preseed – Debian, Ubuntu
