= Ubiquity (software) =

Free and open-source system installer for Ubuntu and its derivatives

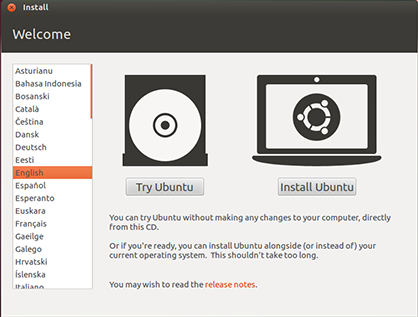
- Ubiquity Installer on Ubuntu 12.04 LTS Precise Pangolin
- Developer: Ubuntu Installer Team
- Release: April 23, 2006; 20 years ago
- Stable release: 22.10.6 / August 24, 2022; 4 years ago
- Preview release: 2.21.43 / January 27, 2016; 10 years ago
- Written in: Python; GUIs: GTK and Qt
- Operating system: Linux
- Platform: Debian-based distributions
- Available in: Multilingual
- Type: System Installer
- License: GNU General Public License, version 2 or later
- Website: launchpad.net/ubiquity
- Repository: code.launchpad.net/ubiquity

Ubiquity is a graphical installer formerly used as the default installer for most Ubuntu variants and some of its derivatives. It is run from the Live CD or USB and can be triggered to run from the options on the device or on the desktop of the Live mode. It was first introduced in Ubuntu 6.06 LTS "Dapper Drake". Since Ubuntu Desktop 23.04, Ubuntu Desktop has used a newer installer based on the same Subiquity code base as Ubuntu Server. At program start, it allows the user to change the language to a local language if they prefer. It is designed to be easy to use.

== Features ==
Ubiquity consists of a configuration wizard allowing the user to easily install Ubuntu and shows a slideshow showcasing many of Ubuntu's features while it is installing. Ubuntu 10.04 included in Ubiquity a slideshow, which meets users with Ubuntu. In Ubuntu 10.10 "Maverick Meerkat", the installer team made changes to simplify the tool and speed up the installation wizard.

Ubiquity allows the user to choose the installer to automatically update the software while it's installing. If the user allows this, the installer will download the latest packages from the Ubuntu repository ensuring the system is up to date.

The installer also allows the user to set Ubiquity to install closed source or patented third party software such as Adobe Flash and Fluendo's MP3 codec software that is commonly needed by users while Ubuntu is installing.

Ubiquity can begin to format the file system and copy system files after the user completes the partition configuration wizard, while the user is inputting data such as username, password, location etc. which reduces install time. When reviewing Ubuntu 10.10, Ryan Paul from Ars Technica said “During my tests, I was able to perform a complete installation in less than 15 minutes.” Ubiquity also provides an interactive map to specify time zones.

At the bottom the installer window, a progress bar is shown once the installation has started. At the end of the configuration stage, a slideshow will show up until the end of install. The slideshow display short summaries and screenshots about the applications in Ubuntu. However though, not all the software shown is in the default installation and are available to download from the Ubuntu Software Center. These are so the user becomes more aware about other applications available for the platform.

Before Ubuntu 12.04 LTS, Ubiquity offered a migration assistant which brought over user accounts from Windows, OS X and other Linux distributions along with e-mail and Instant messaging accounts, Bookmarks from Firefox and Internet Explorer as well as the user's pictures, wallpapers, documents, music, photos folder although this was a Windows only feature. At the Ubuntu Developers Summit for Ubuntu 12.10, the developers agreed to remove this feature citing a lack of testing and a high number of bugs as the reason why the feature has been removed.

Ubuntu created Ubiquity edition for servers named Subiquity. It is graphical installer for Ubuntu Server versions, and included from Ubuntu 18.04.

In October 2018, Lubuntu switched to using Calamares instead of Ubiquity.

== Ports ==
Ubiquity allows OEMs and other Ubuntu derivatives to customise aspects of it such as the slideshow and branding elements. Some Ubiquity ports include:

- Kubuntu
- Xubuntu
- Ubuntu MATE
- Linux Mint
- Elementary OS
- Peppermint Linux OS

Moreover, installation steps may be skipped by changing the install scripts making it possible for OEMs and others to set special defaults or create an automated install routine.

== See also ==
- Anaconda
- Calamares
- Wubi
- Debian-Installer
