= Red Hat Network =

Systems management service for Enterprise Linux

Red Hat Network (abbreviated to RHN) is a family of systems-management services operated by Red Hat. RHN makes updates, patches, and bug fixes of packages included within Red Hat Linux and Red Hat Enterprise Linux available to subscribers. Other available features include the deployment of custom content to, and the provisioning, configuration, reporting, monitoring of client systems.

Users of these operating systems can then invoke the up2date or yum program to download and install updates from RHN. The updates portion of RHN is akin to other types of automatic system maintenance tools such as Microsoft Update for Microsoft Windows operating systems. The system requires a subscription to allow access to updates.

On June 18, 2008, Red Hat CEO Jim Whitehurst announced plans for the RHN Satellite software to be open-sourced following the Fedora/RHEL model. Subsequently, project Spacewalk was launched.

== Architecture ==
In the basic subscription model the information about a managed host is stored on Red Hat's servers, and updates get downloaded directly from those servers as well. For an organization that manages multiple machines this is inefficient bandwidth-wise. Red Hat offers a proxy server (Red Hat Network Proxy) that once installed at a site allows machines to securely download updates locally. Advanced lifecycle management; provisioning features, like bare metal PXE boot provisioning; and monitoring features (e.g. centralized CPU and disk usage) cannot be done over the Internet to the hosted RHN servers. These features require a RHN Satellite Server running locally. As of December 2009 the RHN Proxy Server costs $2,500 annually, and the RHN Satellite Server costs $13,500 annually, which includes the license for the embedded Oracle Database.

== History ==
Date	Version	Description
late 2000		Red Hat Network is born as hosted service.
late 2001		RHN Proxy Server has been created.
January 2002		significant price reduction of RHN.
February 2002		RHN Satellite server created as standalone version of RHN.
October 2002		Red Hat purchased Sunnyvale company and integrate its NOCpulse Command Center systems management software into RHN
2004	RHN 3.2 released	introducing provisioning, Bootstrap Script, Refined Channel Cloning
Spring 2004	RHN 3.3 released	
July 20, 2004	RHN 3.4 released	
December 15, 2004	RHN 3.6 released	introducing Monitoring as technology preview, supporting Red Hat Enterprise Linux AS 3 as base operating system, rhn boostrap utility and push technology (using jabber protocol)
March 22, 2005	RHN 3.7 released	
August 31, 2005	RHN 4.0 released	
February 2, 2007	RHN Satellite 4.2 released	supporting Red Hat Enterprise Linux 5 clients
June 26, 2007	RHN Satellite 5.0 released	introducing virtualization management support.
April 7, 2008	RHN Satellite 5.1 released	Multi-Org feature, Apache 2.0 support, exporter tool, PPC Provisioning Capabilities, 64 bit Platform Support, S390 Platform Support, S390X Platform Support.
June 18, 2008		RHN Satellite (and Proxy) is open source'd. Project Spacewalk is born.
November 5, 2008	RHN Satellite 5.2 released	Red Hat Enterprise Linux 5 is now supported as a base operating system, introducing Oracle 10g support.
September 2, 2009	RHN Satellite 5.3 released	introducing significant upgrade of Multiple Organizations feature, automated system installation via the cobbler, Inter-Satellite Sync, supporting installation as VMWare guest, command line installation of RHN Proxy, SELinux support.
October 27, 2010	RHN Satellite 5.4 released	supporting Red Hat Enterprise Linux 6 clients, introducing spacewalk-repo-sync, Duplicate Profile feature, Support for Oracle 11g, package installation date, symbolic links in configuration management and SELinux support for configuration management.
June 16, 2011	RHN Satellite 5.4.1 released	Red Hat Enterprise Linux 6 is now supported as a base operating system. Internationalized domain names support added.
September 21, 2012	RHN Satellite 5.5 released	IPv6 Enablement, OpenSCAP Support, Clone-By-Date Capability, Provisioning Bonded Network Interfaces
October 1, 2013	RHN Satellite 5.6 released	Enhanced subscription and system reporting, Client system service analysis, Inter-Satellite Sync (ISS) content management and trust refinement, Red Hat Satellite server hot-backups, Automated provisioning in PXE-less environments, Red Hat Satellite server scalability, Choice of external, DBA-managed database
