= Debian-Installer =

System installer for Debian

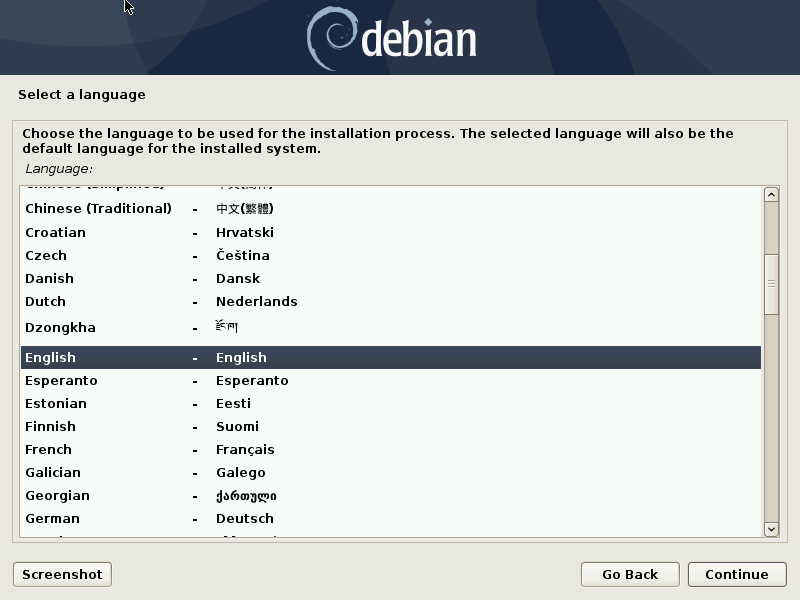
- The language select screen of the Debian Installer
- Original author: Debian Project
- Developer: Debian Install System Team
- Initial release: June 6, 2005; 20 years ago
- Stable release: 12.7 (Bookworm) / June 10, 2023; 2 years ago
- Written in: C
- Operating system: Microcosm of Debian, made of udebs (loading from Windows is supported via win32-loader)
- Available in: 87 languages
- Type: System installer
- License: GPL
- Website: www.debian.org/devel/debian-installer/

Debian-Installer is a system installer for Debian and its derivatives. It originally appeared in Skolelinux (Debian-Edu) 1.0, released in June 2004, but is now used as the official installation system since Debian 3.1 (Sarge), which was released on June 6, 2005.

== Features ==
Debian-Installer consists of two modes: a text mode and a graphical mode. Multiple components of the installer exists to configure various aspects of the installed system, and configuration of some components may require user input.

Regardless of which mode is selected, the installer first prompts the user for a language selection. Some of the tasks the installer performs after a language selection is as follows:

- Detects hardware
- Detect installation media
- Configure the network
- Configure APT/select mirrors
- Set up user accounts
- Detect other operating systems

== Win32-loader ==
win32-loader (officially Debian-Installer Loader) is a discontinued component of the Debian Linux distribution that runs on Windows and has the ability to load the actual Debian installer either from the network (as in the version in an official website) or from CD-ROM media (as in the version included in Jessie CD images).

== See also ==
- Anaconda
- Calamares
- Ubiquity
- Wubi
