= Lubuntu =

Linux distribution based on Ubuntu, utilizing the LXQt desktop environment

- Lubuntu 26.10
- Developer: Lubuntu Community
- OS family: Linux (Unix-like)
- Working state: Active development
- Source model: Open source
- Latest release: 26.04 LTS / 23 April 2026; 6 months ago
- Package manager: APT, snap
- Supported platforms: x86-64
- Kernel type: Monolithic (Linux)
- Userland: GNU
- Default user interface: LXQt
- License: Mainly the GNU GPL/ various others
- Official website: lubuntu.me

Lubuntu (/lʊˈbʊntuː/ luu-BUUN-too) is a lightweight Linux distribution based on Ubuntu that uses the LXQt desktop environment in place of GNOME. Lubuntu was originally touted as being "lighter, less resource hungry and more energy-efficient", but now aims to be "a functional yet modular distribution focused on getting out of the way and letting users use their computer".

Lubuntu originally used the LXDE desktop, but moved to the LXQt desktop with the release of Lubuntu 18.10 in October 2018, due to the slow development of LXDE, losing support for GTK 2 as well as the more active and stable LXQt development without GNOME dependencies.

The name Lubuntu is a portmanteau of LXQt and Ubuntu. The LXQt name derives from the merger of the LXDE and Razor-qt projects, while the word Ubuntu means "humanity towards others" in the Zulu and Xhosa languages.

Lubuntu received official recognition as a formal member of the Ubuntu family on 11 May 2011, commencing with Lubuntu 11.10, which was released on 13 October 2011.

== History ==
First Lubuntu logo

Second Lubuntu logo

Third Lubuntu logo

Fourth Lubuntu logo, incorporating LXQt

Lenny, the official Lubuntu mascot

The LXDE desktop was first made available for Ubuntu in October 2008, with the release of Ubuntu 8.10 Intrepid Ibex. These early versions of Lubuntu, including 8.10, 9.04 and 9.10, were not available as separate ISO image downloads, and could only be installed on Ubuntu as separate lubuntu-desktop packages from the Ubuntu repositories. LXDE can also be retroactively installed in earlier Ubuntu versions.

In February 2009, Mark Shuttleworth invited the LXDE project to become a self-maintained project within the Ubuntu community, with the aim of leading to a dedicated new official Ubuntu derivative to be called Lubuntu.

In March 2009, the Lubuntu project was started on Launchpad by Mario Behling, including an early project logo. The project also established an official Ubuntu wiki project page, that includes listings of applications, packages, and components.

In August 2009, the first test ISO was released as a Live CD, with no installation option.

Initial testing in September 2009 by Linux Magazine reviewer Christopher Smart showed that Lubuntu's RAM usage was about half of that of Xubuntu and Ubuntu on a normal installation and desktop use, and two-thirds less on live CD use.

In 2014, the project announced that the GTK+-based LXDE and Qt-based Razor-qt would be merging into the new Qt-based LXQt desktop and that Lubuntu would consequently be moving to LXQt. The transition was completed with the release of Lubuntu 18.10 in October 2018, the first regular release to employ the LXQt desktop.

Lenny became Lubuntu's mascot in 2014.

During the 2018 transition to becoming LXQt-based, the aim of Lubuntu was re-thought by the development team. It had previously been intended for users with older computers, typically ten years old or newer, but with the introduction of Windows Vista PCs, older computers gained faster processors and much more RAM, and by 2018, ten-year-old computers remained much more capable than had been the case five years earlier. As a result, the Lubuntu development team, under Simon Quigley, decided to change the focus to emphasize a well-documented distribution, based on LXQt "to give users a functional yet modular experience", that is lightweight by default and available in any language. The developers also decided to stop recommending minimum system requirements after the 18.04 LTS release.

In January 2019, the developers formed the Lubuntu Council, a new body to formalize their previous organization, with its own written constitution.

== Releases ==
=== Lubuntu 10.04 ===
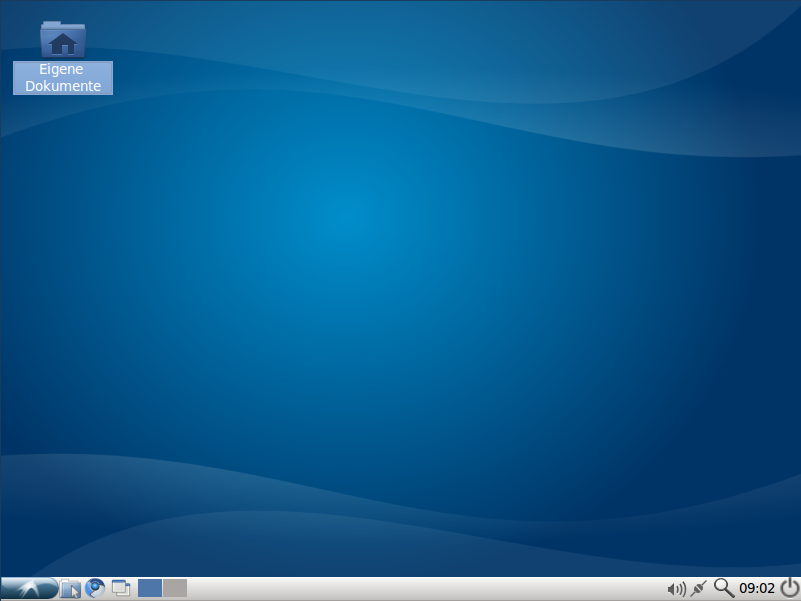
Lubuntu 10.04, the first stand-alone version of Lubuntu available

On 30 December 2009 the first Alpha 1 "Preview" version ISO for Lubuntu 10.04 Lucid Lynx was made available for testing, with Alpha 2 following on 24 January 2010. The first Beta was released on 20 March 2010 and the stable version of Lubuntu 10.04 was released on 2 May 2010, four days behind the main Ubuntu release date of 28 April 2010.

Lubuntu 10.04 was only released as a 32-bit ISO file, but users could install a 64-bit version through the 64-bit Mini ISO and then install the required packages.

Lubuntu 10.04 was not intended to be a long-term support (LTS) release, unlike Ubuntu 10.04 Lucid Lynx, and was only going to be supported for 18 months. However, since the infrastructure of Ubuntu 10.10 Maverick Meerkat (and thus Lubuntu 10.10) dropped support for i586 processors, including VIA C3, AMD K6, and AMD Geode/National Semiconductor CPUs, the release of Lubuntu 10.10 prompted the community to extend support until April 2013 for Lubuntu 10.04, as if it were a long term support version.

In reviewing Lubuntu 10.04 Alpha 1 in January 2010, Joey Sneddon of OMG Ubuntu wrote, "Not having had many preconceptions regarding LXDE/Lubuntu i [sic] found myself presently surprised. It was pleasant to look at, pleasant to use and although I doubt I would switch from GNOME to LXDE, it can give excellent performance to those who would benefit from doing so." In writing about the final 10.10 release, on 10 October 2010 Sneddon termed it "A nimble and easy-to-use desktop".

Writing about Lubuntu 10.04 in May 2010 Damien Oh of Make Tech Easier said: "If you are looking for a lightweight alternative to install in your old PC or netbook, Lubuntu is a great choice. You won't get any eye candy or special graphical effects, but what you get is fast speed at a low cost. It's time to put your old PC back to work."

Also reviewing Lubuntu 10.04 in May 2010 Robin Catling of Full Circle magazine said: "The first thing that impresses on running Lubuntu on my modest Compaq Evo laptop (Pentium-M, 512 MB RAM) is the small memory footprint... It beats Karmic on Gnome, and Xubuntu on Xfce, by a mile. The Evo used to take 60 seconds-plus to boot to the desktop, LXDE takes exactly 30. Yet you're not restricted; gtk2 applications are well supported, and Synaptic hooks up to the Ubuntu repositories for package management (so you can pull down Open Office to replace the default Abi-Word without crippling the machine)." Catling did note of the file manager, "The PCManFM file manager needs a little more maturity to compete with Thunar, but it's a competent and robust application that doesn't hog resources like Nautilus or Dolphin."

In June 2010 Jim Lynch reviewed Lubuntu 10.04, saying, "One thing you'll notice about using the Lubuntu desktop is that it's fast. Very, very fast. Even on an underpowered machine, Lubuntu should perform very well. It's one of the best things about this distro; it leaves behind the bloated eye candy that can sometimes bog down GNOME and KDE... I didn't run into any noticeable problems with Lubuntu. It was very fast and stable, and I didn't see noticeable bugs or problems. I hate it when this happens since it's so much more interesting for my readers when I run into one nasty problem or another. Hopefully the next version of Lubuntu will be chock full of horrendous problems and bugs. Just kidding."

In September 2010 lead developer Julien Lavergne announced that the Lubuntu project had not been granted official status as a derivative of Ubuntu as part of the Ubuntu 10.04 release cycle, but that work would continue on this goal for Ubuntu 10.10. Lavergne explained the reasons as "there is still a resource problem on Canonical/Ubuntu infrastructure, which was not resolved during this cycle. Also, they are writing a real process to integrate new member in the Ubuntu family, but it's still not finished."

=== Lubuntu 10.10 ===
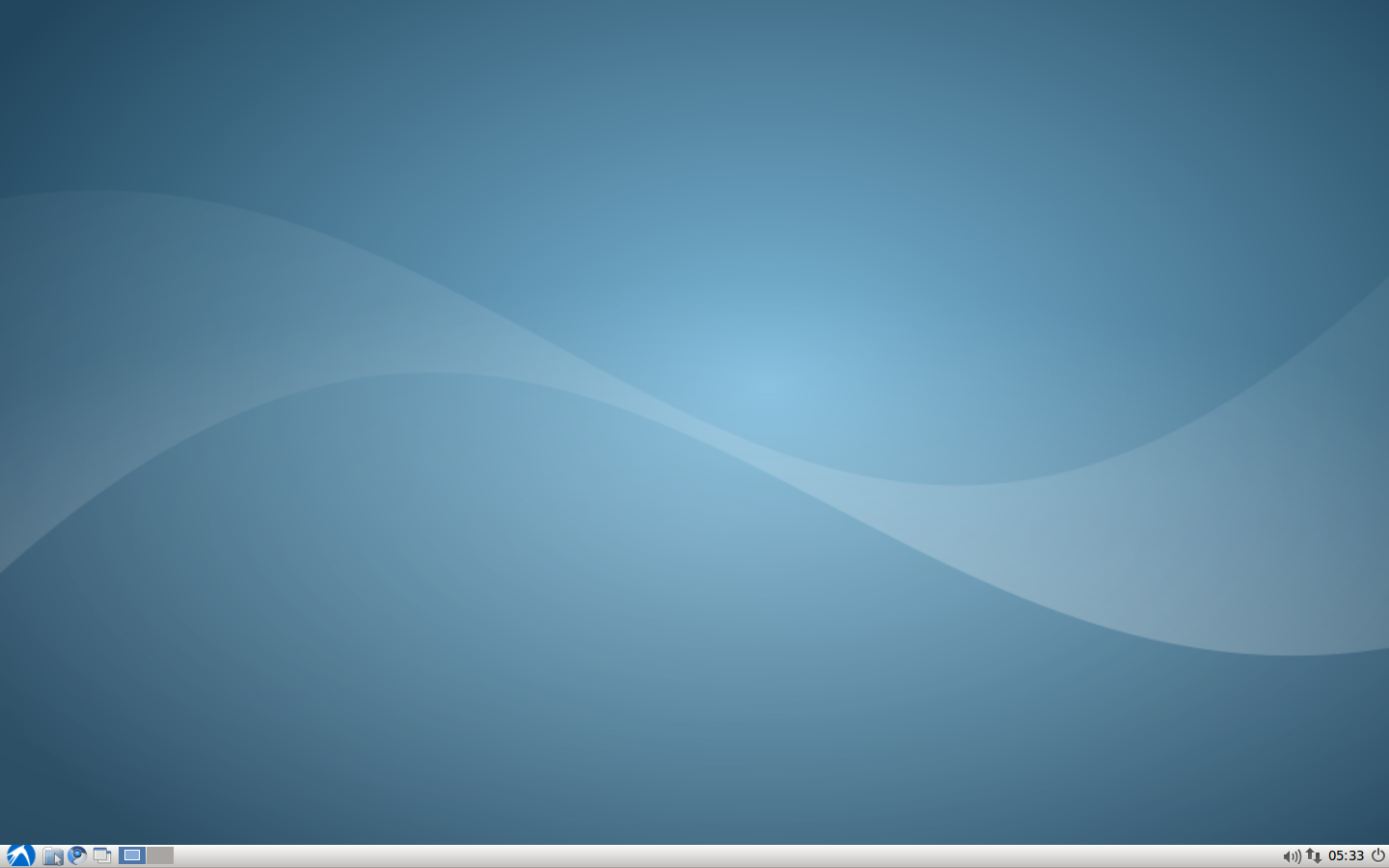
Lubuntu 10.10

Lubuntu 10.10 was released on schedule on 10 October 2010, the same day as Ubuntu 10.10 Maverick Meerkat, but it was not built with the same underlying infrastructure as Ubuntu 10.10. Developer Julien Lavergne said about it, "Lubuntu is actually not part of the Ubuntu family, and not build [sic] with the current Ubuntu infrastructure. This release is considered as a "stable beta", a result that could be a final and stable release if we was [sic] included in the Ubuntu family." Version 10.10 introduced new artwork to the distribution, including new panel and menu backgrounds, a new Openbox theme, new Lubuntu menu logo, splash images and desktop wallpaper. Lubuntu 10.10 was not accepted as an official Ubuntu derivative at this release point due to "a lack of integration with the infrastructure Canonical and Ubuntu" but work is continuing towards that goal.

Lubuntu 10.10 was only released as a 32-bit ISO file, but users could install a 64-bit version through the 64-bit Mini ISO and then install the required packages.

Developer Julien Lavergne wrote that while 10.10 incorporated many changes over 10.04, not all of the changes were considered improvements. The improvements included a new theme designed by Rafael Laguna, the incorporation of xpad for note taking, Ace-of-Penguins games, LXTask the LXDE task manager in place of the Xfce application, replacing the epdfview PDF reader with Evince due to a memory leak problem and removing pyneighborhood. The minuses included a last-minute rewrite of the installer to integrate it properly, which resulted in some installation instability and the raising of the minimum installation RAM from 180 MB to 256 MB. The other issue was the incorporation of the Ubuntu Update Manager which increased RAM usage by 10 MB. Lubuntu 10.04 had no indication of updates being available, so this was deemed necessary.

The minimum system requirements for Lubuntu 10.10 were described by Mario Behling as "comparable to Pentium II or Celeron systems with a 128 MB RAM configuration, which may yield a slow yet usable system with lubuntu." Chief developer Julien Lavergne stated that the minimum RAM to install Lubuntu 10.10 is 256 MB.

In reviewing Lubuntu 10.10 right after its release in October 2010, Jim Lynch of Eye on Linux said "Lubuntu's biggest appeal for me is its speed; and it's no disappointment in that area. Applications load and open quickly, and my overall experience with Lubuntu was quite positive. I detected no stability problems, Lubuntu 10.10 was quite solid and reliable the entire time I used it." Lynch did fault the choice of Synaptic as the package manager: "One of the strange things about Lubuntu is that it only offers Synaptic as its package manager. Xubuntu 10.10, on the other hand, offers the Ubuntu Software Center as well as Synaptic. I'm not sure why the Ubuntu Software Center is missing from Lubuntu; it would make a lot of sense to include it since it is a much easier and more attractive way to manage software. Synaptic gets the job done, but it's less friendly to new users and can't match the Ubuntu Software Center in terms of usability and comfort."

By mid-December 2010, Lubuntu had risen to 11th place on DistroWatch's six-month list of most popular Linux distributions out of 319 distributions, right behind Puppy Linux and well ahead of Xubuntu, which was in 36th place. In reviewing Linux distribution rankings for DistroWatch in early January 2011 for the year 2010 versus 2009, Ladislav Bodnár noted, "Looking through the tables, an interesting thing is the rise of distributions that use the lightweight, but full-featured LXDE desktop or the Openbox window manager. As an example, Lubuntu now comfortably beats Kubuntu in terms of page hits..."

=== Lubuntu 11.04 ===
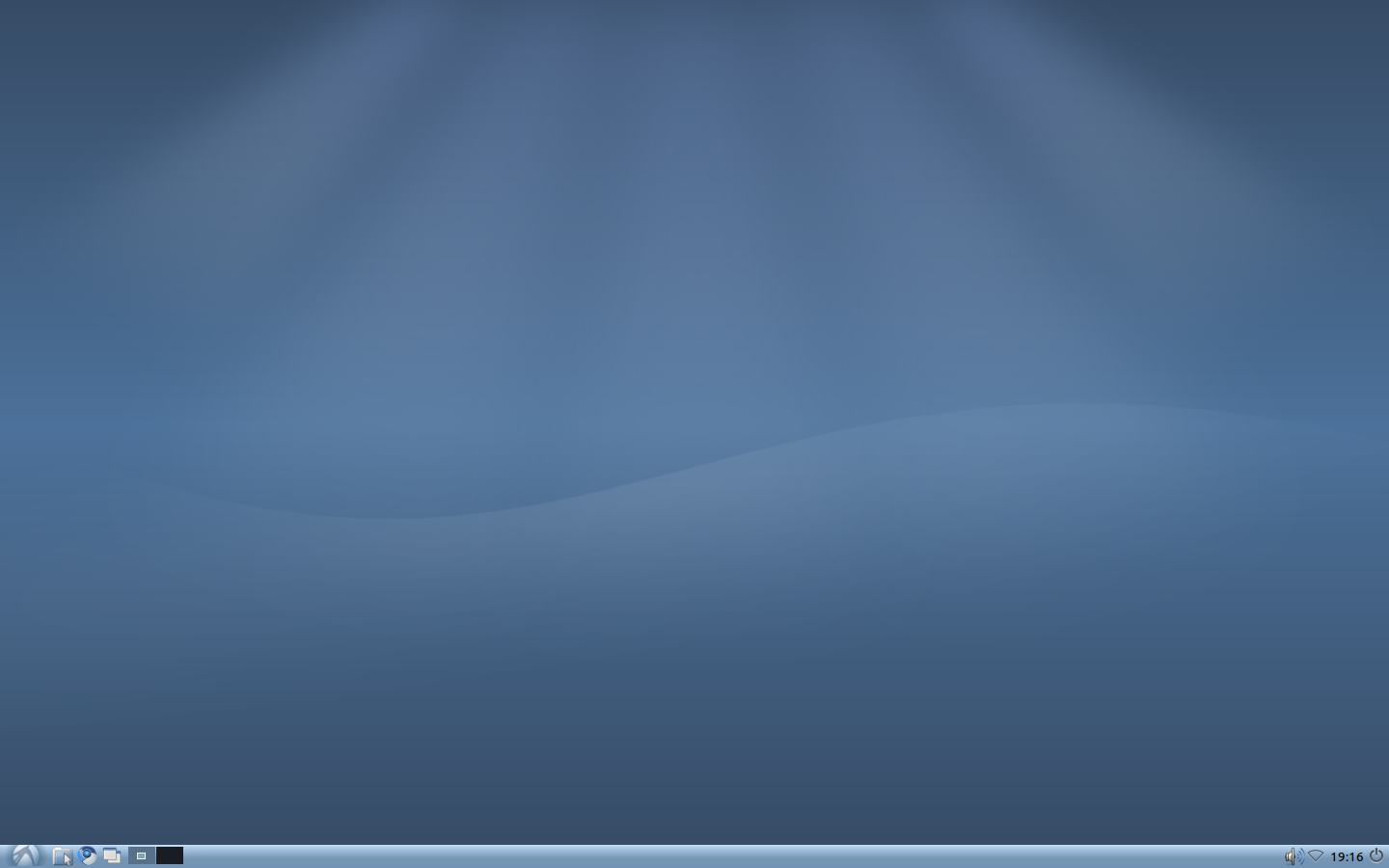
Lubuntu 11.04

The project announced the development schedule in November 2010 and Lubuntu 11.04 was released on time on 28 April 2011.

Lubuntu 11.04 was only released as a 32-bit ISO file, but users could install a 64-bit version through the 64-bit Mini ISO and then install the required packages. An unofficial 64-bit ISO of 11.04 was also released by Kendall Weaver of Peppermint OS.

Improvements in Lubuntu 11.04 included replacing Aqualung with Audacious as the default music player, elimination of the hardware abstraction layer, introducing movable desktop icons, the Ubuntu font being used by default, improved menu translations and reorganized menus. The release also introduced a new default theme and artwork designed by Raphael Laguna, known as Ozone, which is partly based on Xubuntu's default Bluebird theme.

Lubuntu 11.04 can be run with as little as 128 MB of RAM, but requires 256 MB of RAM to install using the graphical installer.

While Lubuntu 11.04 had not completed the process for official status as a member of the Ubuntu family, Mario Behling stated: "The next goals of the project are clear. Apart from constantly improving the distribution, the lubuntu project aims to become an official flavour of Ubuntu."

Mark Shuttleworth remarked to the Lubuntu developers upon the release of 11.04:

Thanks for the great work and progress of Lubuntu in the past 2 years. The fact that you are now 100% in the archive, and using PPA's and other tools effectively, makes it possible for us to consider recognising Lubuntu as an official part of the project. ... From my perspective, I see no problem in providing Lubuntu with the means to book sessions at UDS [Ubuntu Developer Summit], and for us to call attention to Lubuntu in the project release notes. ... Our goal with Ubuntu is to ensure that the archive contains the full richness of free software. LXDE is definitely part of that, and with the other desktop environments making greater demands on PC resources, LXDE has a continued role to play.

In reviewing Lubuntu 11.04 just after its release, Joey Sneddon of OMG Ubuntu commented on its look: "Lubuntu's 'traditional' interface will be of comfort to those agitated by the interface revolution heralded in GNOME 3 and Ubuntu Unity; it certainly won't appeal to 'bling' fans! But that's not to say attention hasn't been paid to the appearance. The new default theme by Raphael Laguna and the use of the Ubuntu font helps to give the sometimes-basic-feeling OS a distinctly professional look." On the subject of official status Sneddon said, "Lubuntu has long sought official sanction from the Ubuntu Project family to be classed as an official 'derivative' of Ubuntu, earning a place alongside Kubuntu and Xubuntu. With such an accomplished release as Lubuntu 11.04 the hold out on acceptance remains disappointing if expected."

In a review on 12 May 2011 Jim Lynch of Desktop Linux Reviews faulted 11.04 for not using the Ubuntu Software Center, the lack of alternative wallpapers and the use of AbiWord in place of LibreOffice. He did praise Lubuntu, saying: "speed is one of the nice things about Lubuntu; even on a slow or older system it's usually quite fast. It's amazing what you can achieve when you cut out the unnecessary eye-candy and bloat."

Also on 12 May 2011, Koen Vervloesem writing in Linux User & Developer criticized the applications bundled with Lubuntu, saying "Some of the software choices are rather odd, however. For instance, Chromium is the default web browser, which is a sensible move for a distro aimed at low-end computers, but the developers also ship Firefox, so Lubuntu shows both web browsers in the Internet menu. Also, the default screenshot program is scrot, but this is a command-line program and it is not shown in the Accessories menu, so not everyone will find it. Another odd choice is that you install your applications with Synaptic: by default Lubuntu doesn't have the Ubuntu Software Center, which has been the preferred software installation program in Ubuntu for a good few releases now. These are just minor inconveniences, though, since you get access to the full Ubuntu software repositories, meaning you can install your favourite applications in a blink of the eye."

One month after its release, Lubuntu 11.04 had risen to ninth place on the DistroWatch 30-day list of most popular distributions.

=== Lubuntu 11.10 ===
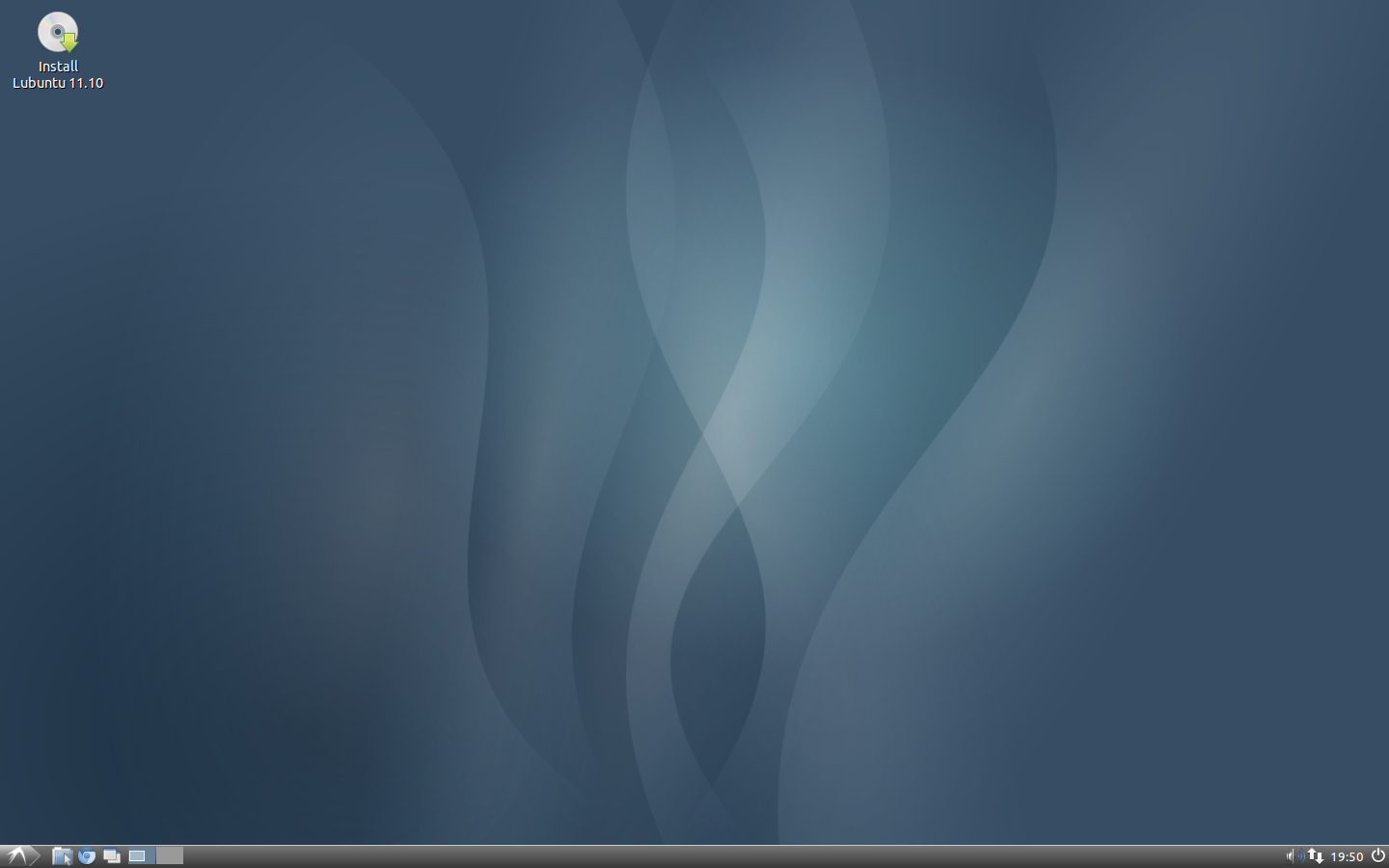
Lubuntu 11.10

Lubuntu 11.10 was the first version of Lubuntu with official sanction as a member of the Ubuntu family. As part of this status change Lubuntu 11.10 used the latest Ubuntu infrastructure and the ISO files were hosted by Ubuntu. The release did not include many new features as work focused on integration with Ubuntu instead.

11.10 was released on 13 October 2011, the same day that Ubuntu 11.10 was released.

In September 2011 it was announced that work on a Lubuntu Software Center was progressing. The Ubuntu Software Center is too resource intensive for Lubuntu and so Lubuntu has been using the less user-friendly Synaptic package manager in recent releases. The development of a new lightweight application manager for Lubuntu is intended to rectify this problem, although users can, of course, install the Ubuntu Software Center using Synaptic.

Changes in Lubuntu 11.10 include that it was built with the Ubuntu official build system using the current packages by default, alternative install and 64-bit ISOs were provided, use of xfce4-power-manager, a new microblog client, pidgin-microblog and a new theme by Rafael Laguna.

Lubuntu 11.10 requires a minimum of 128 MB of RAM to run and 256 MB of RAM to install with the graphic installer. The recommended minimum RAM to run a live CD session is 384 MB.

The Lubuntu 11.10 ISO file contains a known issue that causes it to fail to load a live CD session on some hardware, instead loading to a command prompt. Users are required to enter sudo start lxdm at the prompt to run the live CD session.

In a review of Lubuntu 11.10 on PC Mech, writer Rich Menga described it as "simple, rock-solid, reliable, trustworthy". He added "Ubuntu at this point is suffering from major bloat on the interface side of things, and you can even say that about Xubuntu at this point – but not Lubuntu, as it gets back to what a great Linux distro should be."

By the end of October 2011 Lubuntu had risen to seventh place on the DistroWatch one month popularity list.

In a review in Linux User and Developer in November 2011, Russell Barnes praised Lubuntu 11.10 for its low system hardware requirements, for providing an alternative to GNOME and KDE, saying that its "aesthetic appeal and functionality is minimally compromised in its effort to be as sleek and light as possible". Barnes noted that Mark Shuttleworth may have been wise to offer full status to Lubuntu for this release given the "fuss and bluster surrounding Unity". Of the aesthetics he stated "the now trademark pale blue of the desktop is almost hypnotic. It's incredibly clean, clear and logically laid out – a user experience a million miles away from that of Ubuntu 11.10's Unity or GNOME Shell counterparts. In comparison there's an almost cleansing nature about its simplicity." Barnes rated it as 4/5 and concluded "While it's not as flexible or pretty as [GNOME 2], Lubuntu 11.10 has certainly got everything you need to keep your computer happy and your desktop clean and clutter-free"

Igor Ljubuncic in Dedoimedo said about Lubuntu 11.10, "Lubuntu is meant to offer a valid alternative to the heavier KDE and Unity flavors. It tries bravely and fails heroically. The only advantage is the somewhat reduced system resource usage, but it is more than triply negatively compensated by the drawbacks of the desktop environment as well as the incomplete integration. Then, there you have Samba-related crashes, no laptop hotkeys, jumbled system tray icons, low battery life. If you want to be really mean, you could add the lack of customization, an average software arsenal, and a dozen other smaller things that get in the way... All in all, Lubuntu could work for you, but it's not exciting or spectacular in any way and packages a handsome bag of problems that you can easily avoid by using the main release... I would not recommend this edition... Grade: 6/10."

=== Lubuntu 12.04 ===
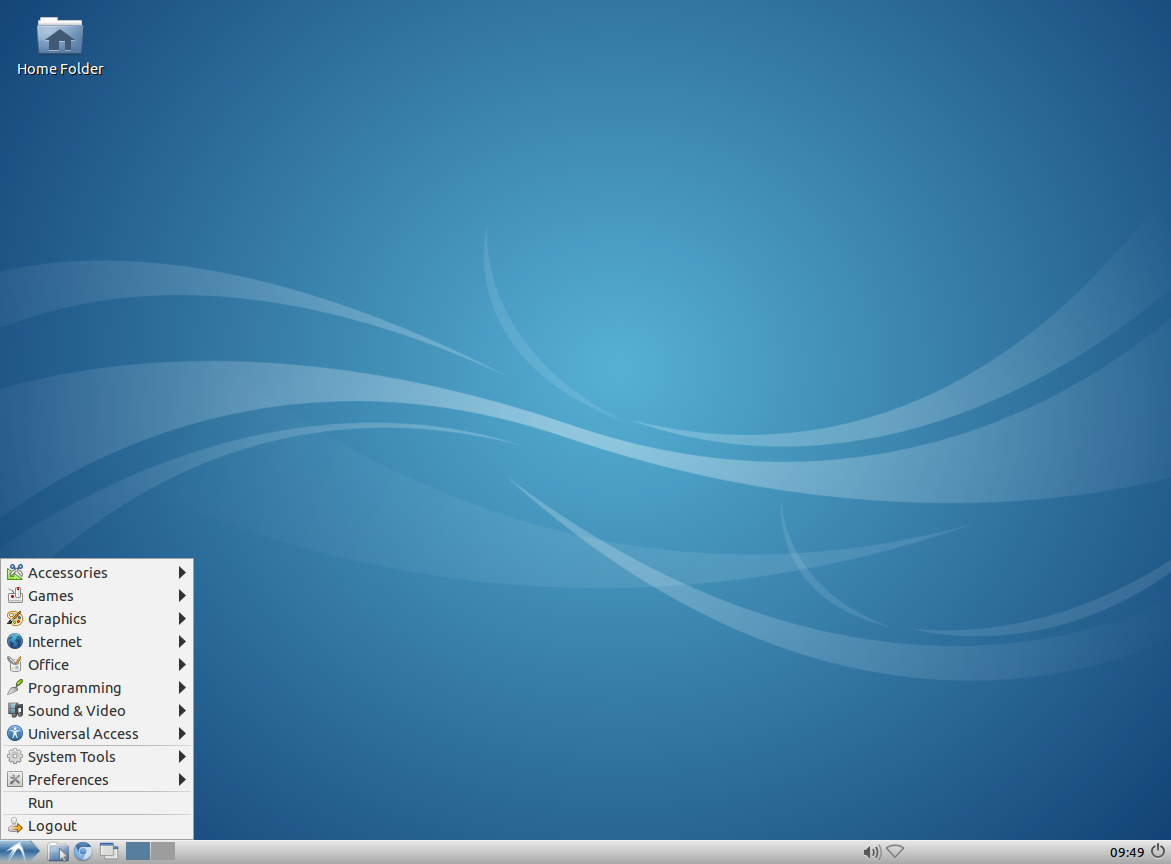
Lubuntu 12.04

Lubuntu 12.04 was released on 26 April 2012. Planning for this release took place at the Ubuntu Developer Summit held in early November 2011. Changes planned at that time for the release included the use of LightDM as the X display manager and of Blueman instead of gnome-bluetooth for managing bluetooth devices.

The Lubuntu Software Center was added with this release to provide a more user-friendly graphical interface for managing applications. Synaptic package manager is still installed by default and allows users to manage all packages in the system. GDebi allows the installation of downloaded .deb packages.

Lubuntu 12.04 was released with the Linux v3.2.14 Linux kernel and also introduced a large number of bug fixes, particularly in the LX panel and in the PCManFM file manager. The Ubuntu Backports repository was enabled by default, meaning backport packages were not installed by default, but once installed were automatically upgraded to newer versions.

=== Lubuntu 12.10 ===
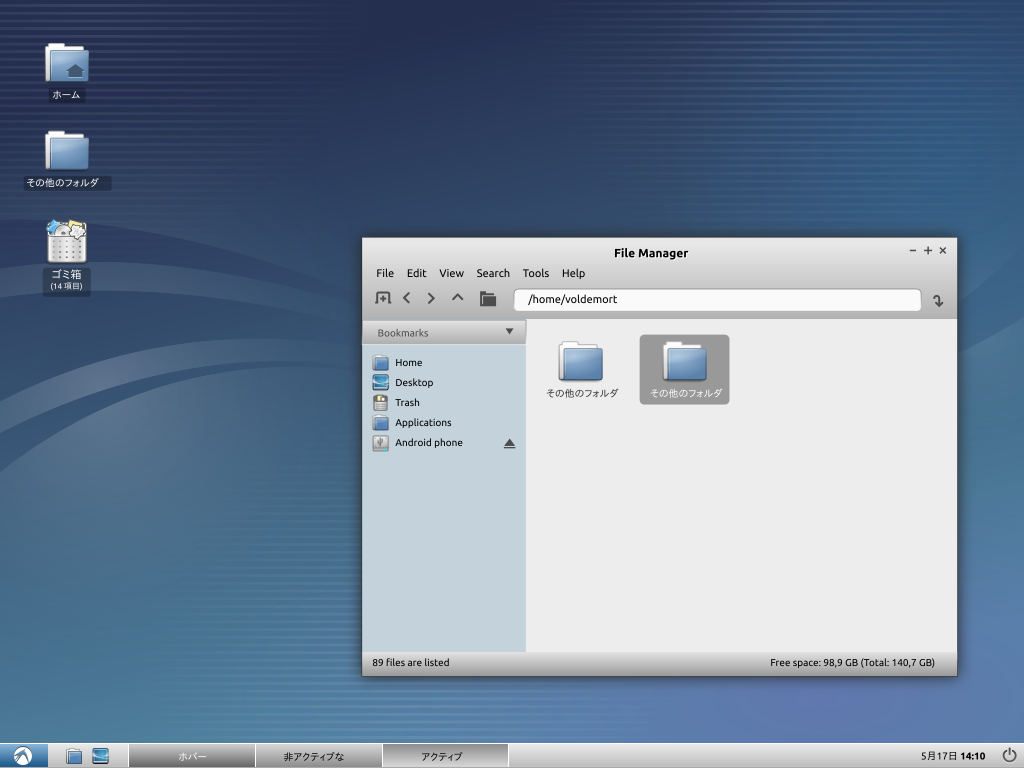
Lubuntu 12.10

Lubuntu 12.10 was released on 18 October 2012 and includes a new version of the session manager, with more customization and integration options. It also includes a new version of the PCMan File Manager, with external thumbnail support. This version has new artwork, including a new wallpaper, a new icon set entitled Box and adjusted GTK themes. The notification-daemon has been replaced by xfce4-notifyd on the default installation. Previous versions of Lubuntu did not have a GUI search function and so the Catfish search utility was added to the default installation.

This version of Lubuntu uses the Linux kernel 3.5.5, Python 3.2 and OpenJDK7 as the default Java implementation.

The installation requires a CPU with Physical Address Extensions (PAE), which indicates an Intel Pentium Pro and newer CPU, except most 400 MHz-bus versions of the Pentium M. In the case of PowerPCs, it was tested on a PowerPC G4 running at 867 MHz with 640 MB RAM and will also run on all Intel-based Apple Macs. There is also a version that supports the ARM architecture, but the developers currently only provide installation instructions for one ARM-based device (the Toshiba AC100 netbook).

This release of Lubuntu does not support UEFI Secure Boot, unlike Ubuntu 12.10, which would have allowed it to run on hardware designed for Windows 8. Lubuntu 12.10 could be run on UEFI secure boot hardware by turning off the secure boot feature.

=== Lubuntu 13.04 ===
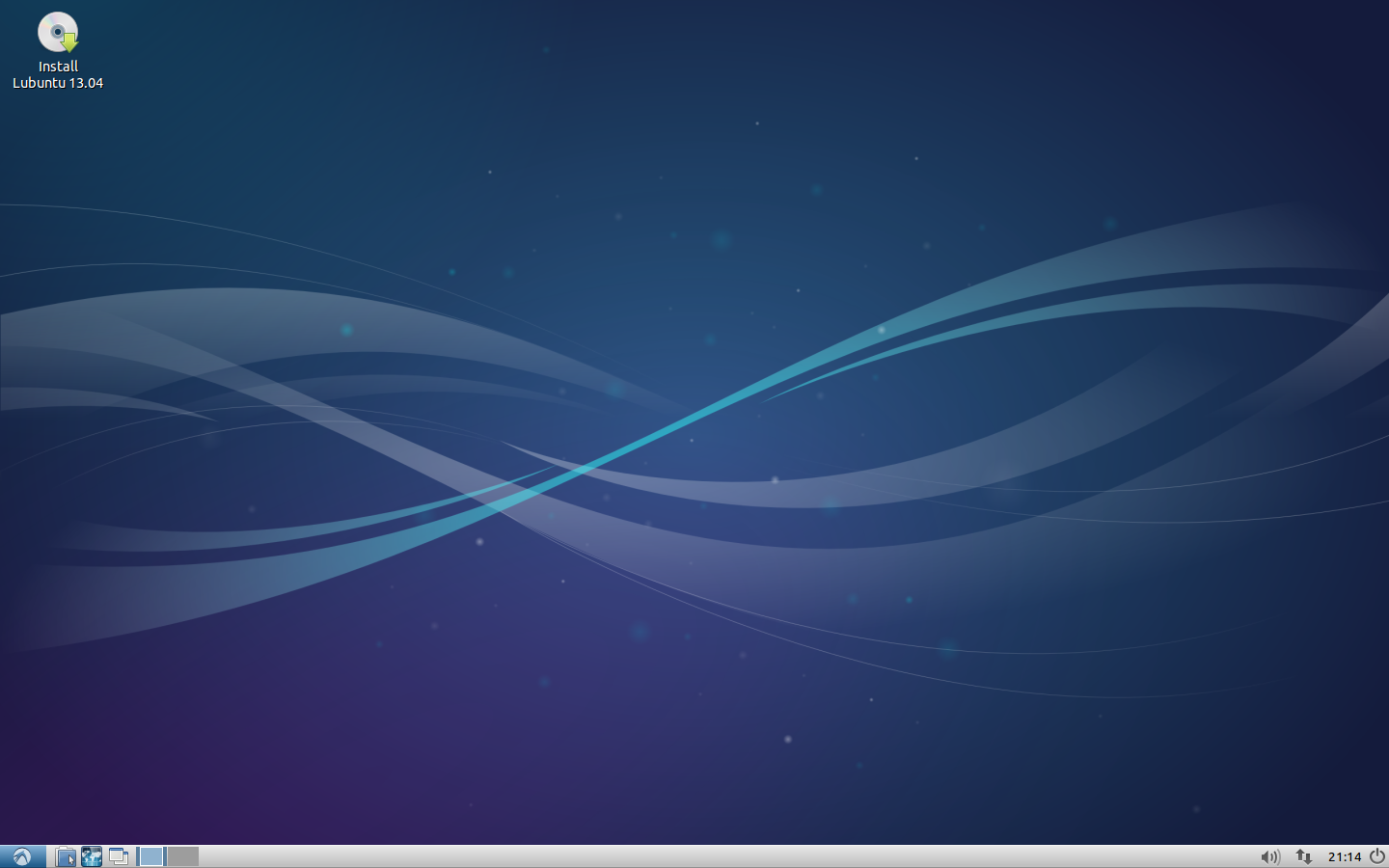
Lubuntu 13.04

Lubuntu 13.04 was released on 25 April 2013.

This version only incorporated some minor changes over Lubuntu 12.10, including a new version of the PCManFM file manager which incorporates a built-in search utility. Due to this particular file manager update, the Catfish search utility was no longer required and was deleted. Lubuntu 13.04 also introduced some artwork improvements, with new wallpaper offerings, new icons and a new installation slideshow.

The minimum system requirements for Lubuntu 13.04 are a Pentium II or Celeron CPU with PAE support, 128 MB of RAM and at least 2 GB of hard-drive space. This release also still supports PowerPC architecture, requiring a G4 867 MHz processor and 640 MB of RAM minimum.

=== Lubuntu 13.10 ===
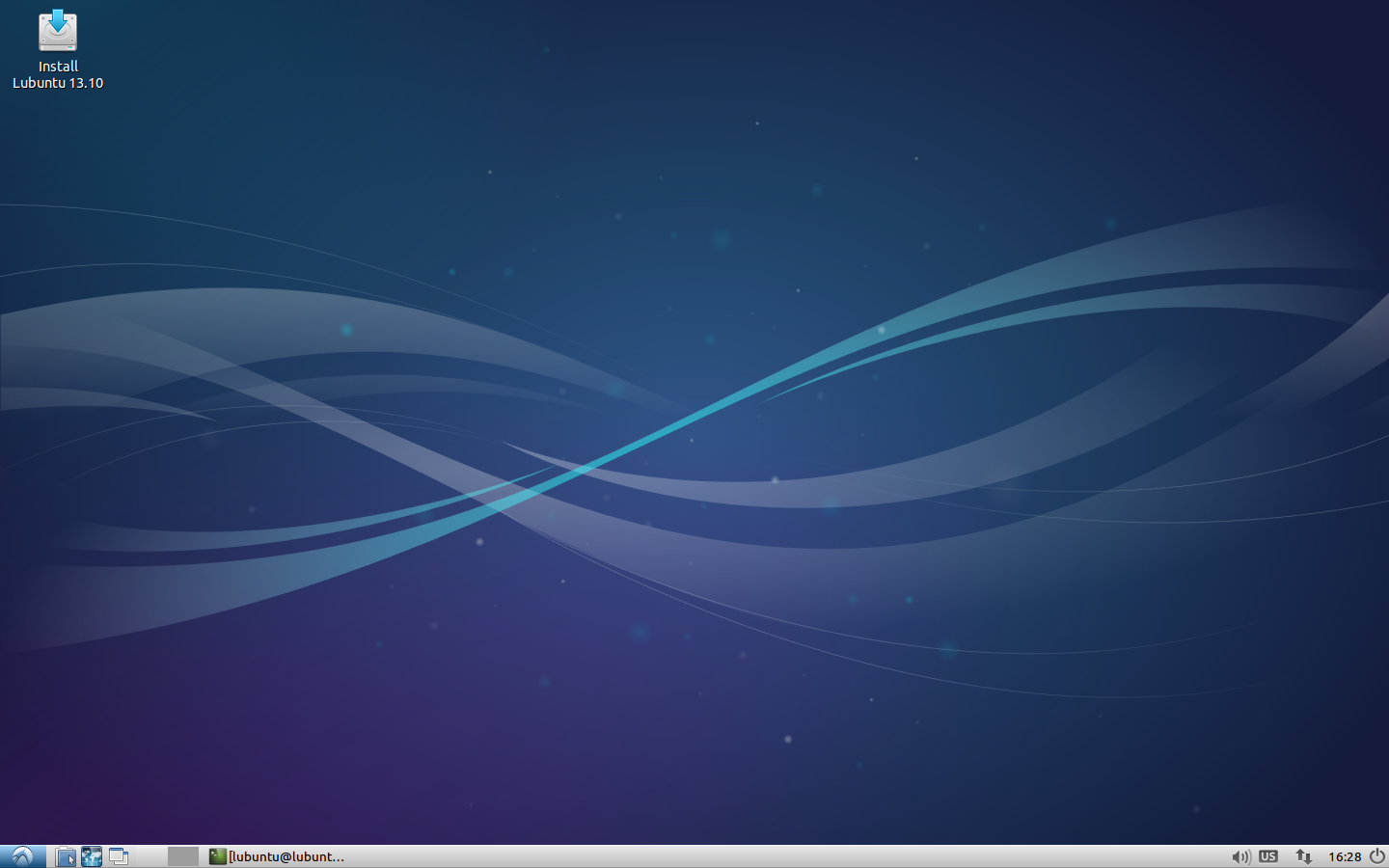
Lubuntu 13.10

Julien Lavergne announced in June 2013 that Lubuntu 13.10 would ship with Firefox as its default browser in place of Chromium. This release also used LightDM for screen locking and included zRam.

In reviewing the beta release in September 2013, Joey Sneddon of OMG Ubuntu said: "Lubuntu has never looked as good as it does in this latest beta." He noted that the new "box" icon theme had been expanded, progress bar colours softened and window controls enlarged along with a sharpened "start button".

The final release incorporated only minor changes over 13.04. It included a new version of PCManFM that includes a file search function, which allowed the Catfish desktop search to be removed. There was also new artwork included and bug fixes for gnome-mplayer and the gpicview image viewer.

In reviewing Lubuntu 13.10, Jim Lynch said "Sometimes less can be much, much more when it comes to Linux distributions. Lubuntu 13.10 offers some of the advantages of Ubuntu but in a much more minimalist package."

=== Lubuntu 14.04 LTS ===
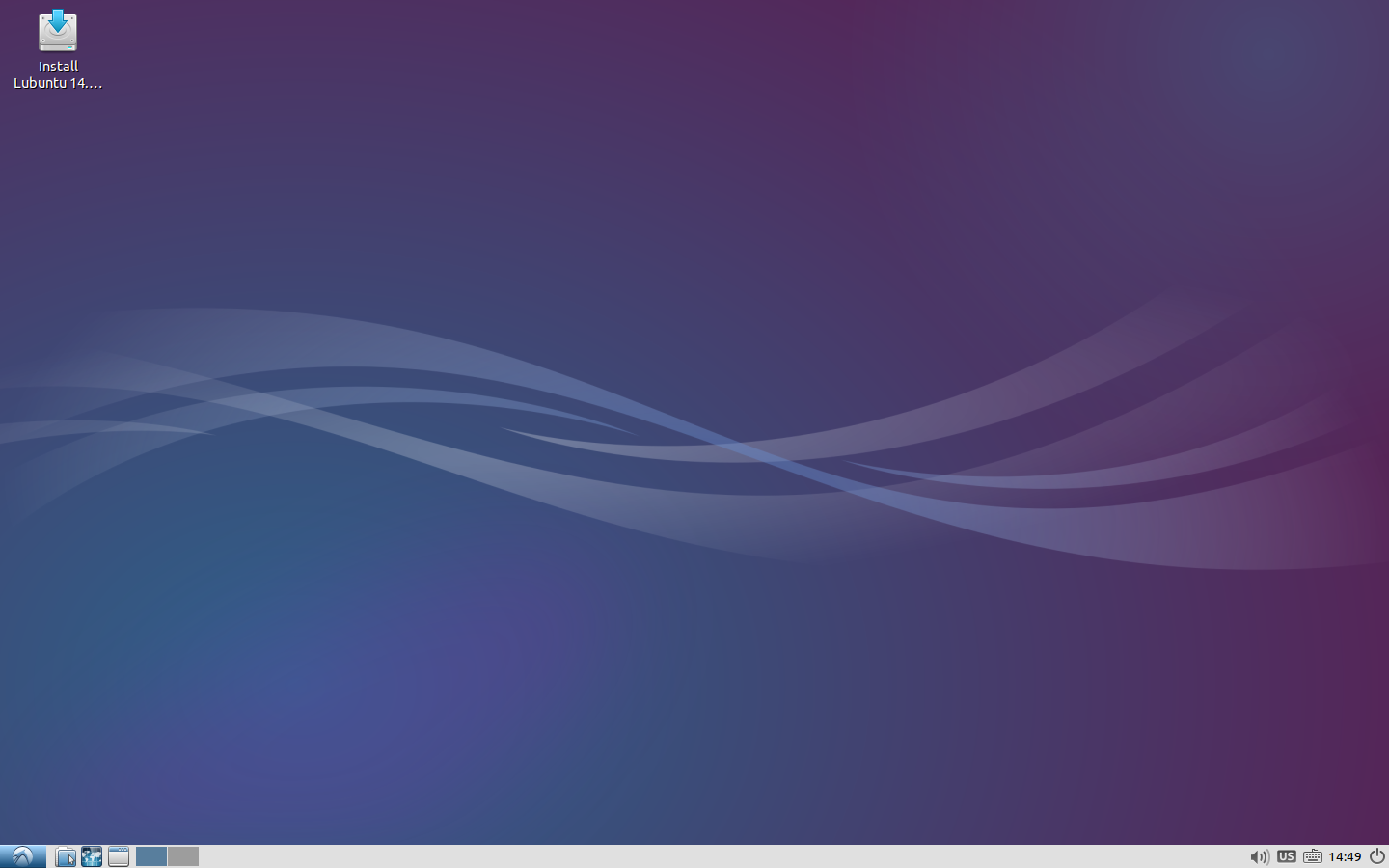
Lubuntu 14.04 LTS

Tentative plans were announced in April 2013 to make Lubuntu 14.04 a long term support release. In November 2013 it was confirmed that 14.04 would be the first Lubuntu LTS release with three years of support. This release also saw xscreensaver replaced by light-locker screen lock.

Released on 17 April 2014, Lubuntu 14.04 included just minor updates over version 13.10, along with a more featured file manager.

Download media for Lubuntu 14.04 is available in PC 32-bit, PC 64-bit, Mac Intel 64-bit and Mac PowerPC. For early Intel Macs with a 32-bit Core solo processor, a 32-bit PC image is available.

In reviewing Lubuntu 14.04 LTS Silviu Stahie of Softpedia noted, "because it uses a similar layout with the one found on the old and defunct Windows XP, this OS is considered to be a very good and appropriate replacement for Microsoft's operating system."

On 1 June 2014 Jim Lynch reviewed Lubuntu 14.04 LTS and concluded, "Lubuntu 14.04 LTS performed very well for me. It was fast and quite stable while I was using it. I had no problems running any applications and the system as a whole lived up to its reputation as a great choice for Ubuntu minimalists... The LXDE desktop environment is very different than Unity for Ubuntu or GNOME 3 in Ubuntu GNOME. It's a traditional desktop which means it's very quick and easy to learn how to use. And if you are someone that doesn't like Unity or GNOME then LXDE in Lubuntu 14.04 LTS might be just what the doctor ordered. You'll get all the benefits of Ubuntu, but without the discomfort of the Unity interface."

=== Lubuntu 14.10 ===
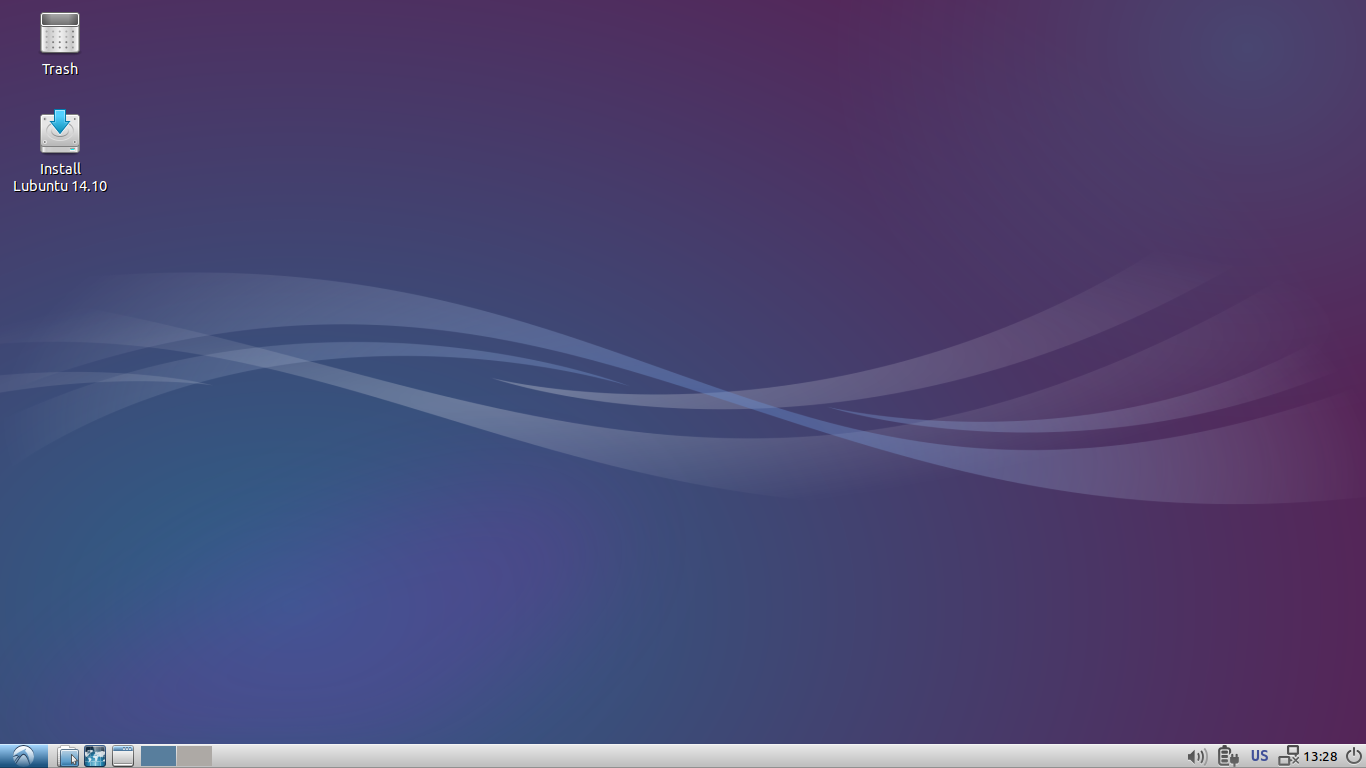
Lubuntu 14.10

This release, on 23 October 2014, was originally intended to feature a version of LXDE based upon the Qt toolkit and called LXQt, but development of the latter was delayed and the feature was not implemented in time.

Lubuntu 14.10 incorporated general bug fixes in preparation for the implementation of LXQt, updated LXDE components and new artwork, including more icons and a theme update.

Silviu Stahie, writing for Softpedia, stated, "One of the main characteristics of Lubuntu is the fact that it's fast, even on older computers. Basically, Lubuntu is able to run on anything built in the last decade, and there are very few operating systems out there that can claim the same thing... Just like its Ubuntu base, Lubuntu 14.10 has seen very few important visual modifications, although many packages have been updated under the hood. The theme and the icons have been updated, but the developers are preparing to make the switch to LXQt, a project that is still in the works."

Igor Ljubuncic in Dedoimedo said about Lubuntu 14.10, "There's nothing functionally wrong with Lubuntu. It's not bad. It's simply not interesting. It's meat without flavor, it's a hybrid car, it's accounting lessons at the local evening school, it's morning news, it's a visit to Pompei while blindfolded. There's no excitement... I liked this desktop environment in the past, but it's stagnated. It hasn't evolved at all, and its competitors have left it far behind. And that reflects poorly on Lubuntu, which, despite a calm and stable record of spartan behavior, has left with me an absolute zero of emotional attachment toward it."

=== Lubuntu 15.04 ===
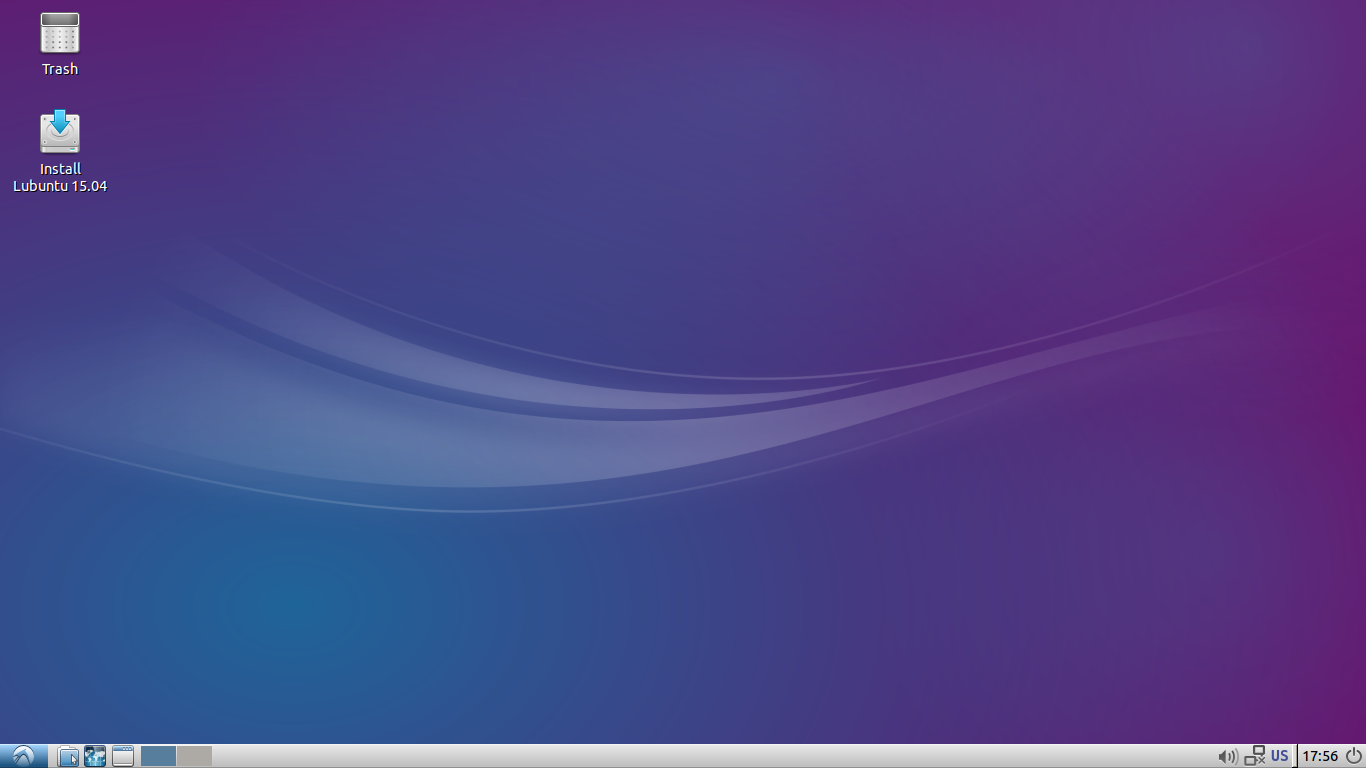
Lubuntu 15.04

Released on 23 April 2015, Lubuntu 15.04 consisted primarily of bug fixes, as the project prepared for the planned switch to LXQt in Lubuntu 15.10. The Lubuntu Box theme was updated and merged into the Ubuntu Light theme to incorporate the most recent GTK+ features, including new header bars for GNOME native applications, plus improved artwork and icons.

The minimum system requirements for this release include: 512 MB of RAM, with 1 GB recommended, plus a Pentium 4 or Pentium M or AMD K8 processor. The release notes indicated about graphics cards: "Nvidia, AMD/ATI/Radeon and Intel work out of the box".

Marius Nestor of Softpedia noted, "...the Lubuntu 15.04 operating system comes now with updated artwork, which includes an updated theme, more beautiful icons, and an updated GTK+ infrastructure for better compatibility with Qt applications."

=== Lubuntu 15.10 ===
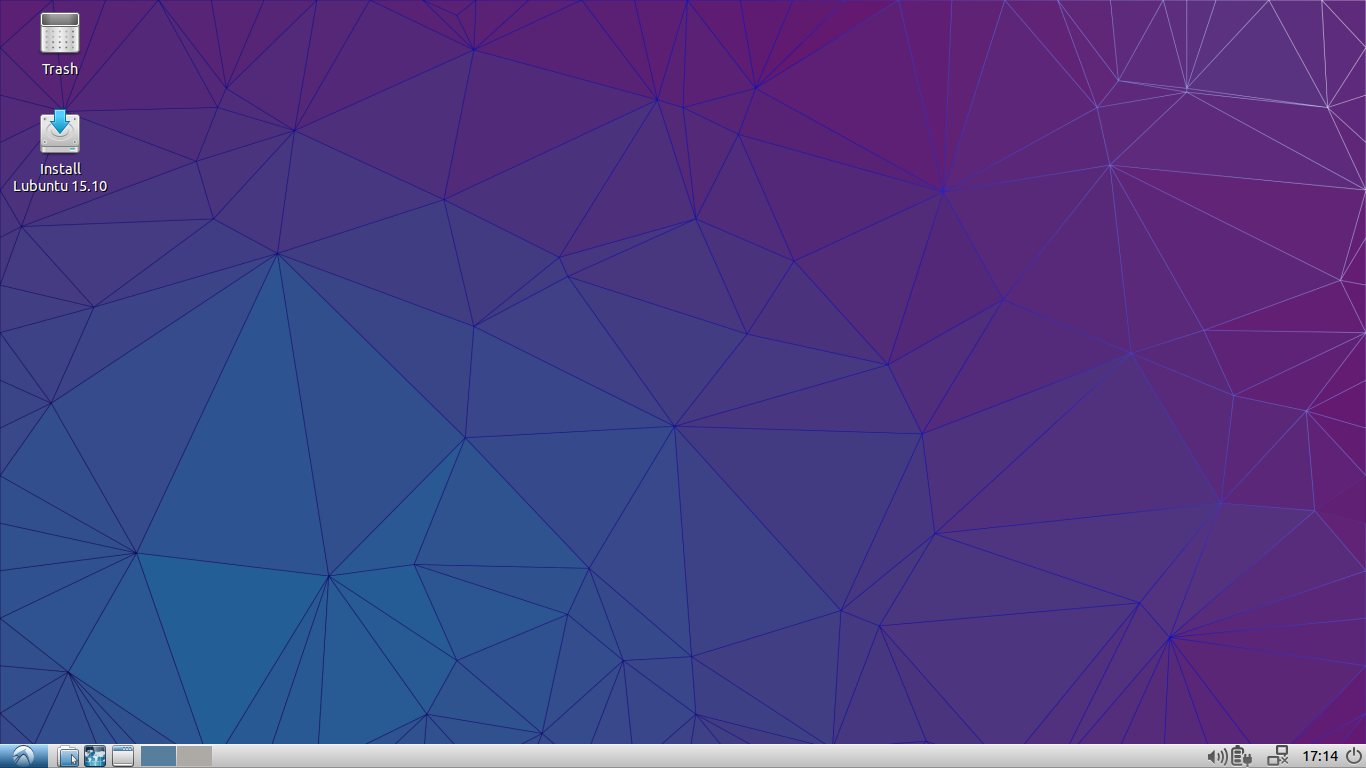
Lubuntu 15.10

Released on 22 October 2015, Lubuntu 15.10 was originally planned to move to LXQt and its Qt libraries in place of the GTK+ libraries used by LXDE, but in June 2015 this was delayed to a future release. The release ended up as a minor bug fix and application version update.

Changes in this versions included new artwork, iBus replaced by Fcitx, allowing fonts for Chinese, Japanese and Korean to be included. lubuntu-extra-sessions is now optional instead of default.

The minimum system requirements for this release stated, "For advanced internet services like Google+, Youtube, Google Docs and Facebook, your computer needs about 1 GB RAM. For local programs like Libre Office and simple browsing habits, your computer needs about 512 MB RAM... The minimum specification for CPU is Pentium 4 or Pentium M or AMD K8. Older processors are too slow and AMD K7 has problems with flash video... Nvidia, AMD/ATI/Radeon and Intel work out of the box, or the system can be tweaked to work fairly easily.

Joey Sneddon of OMG Ubuntu humorously noted, "Lubuntu 15.10 is another highly minor bug fix release."

=== Lubuntu 16.04 LTS ===
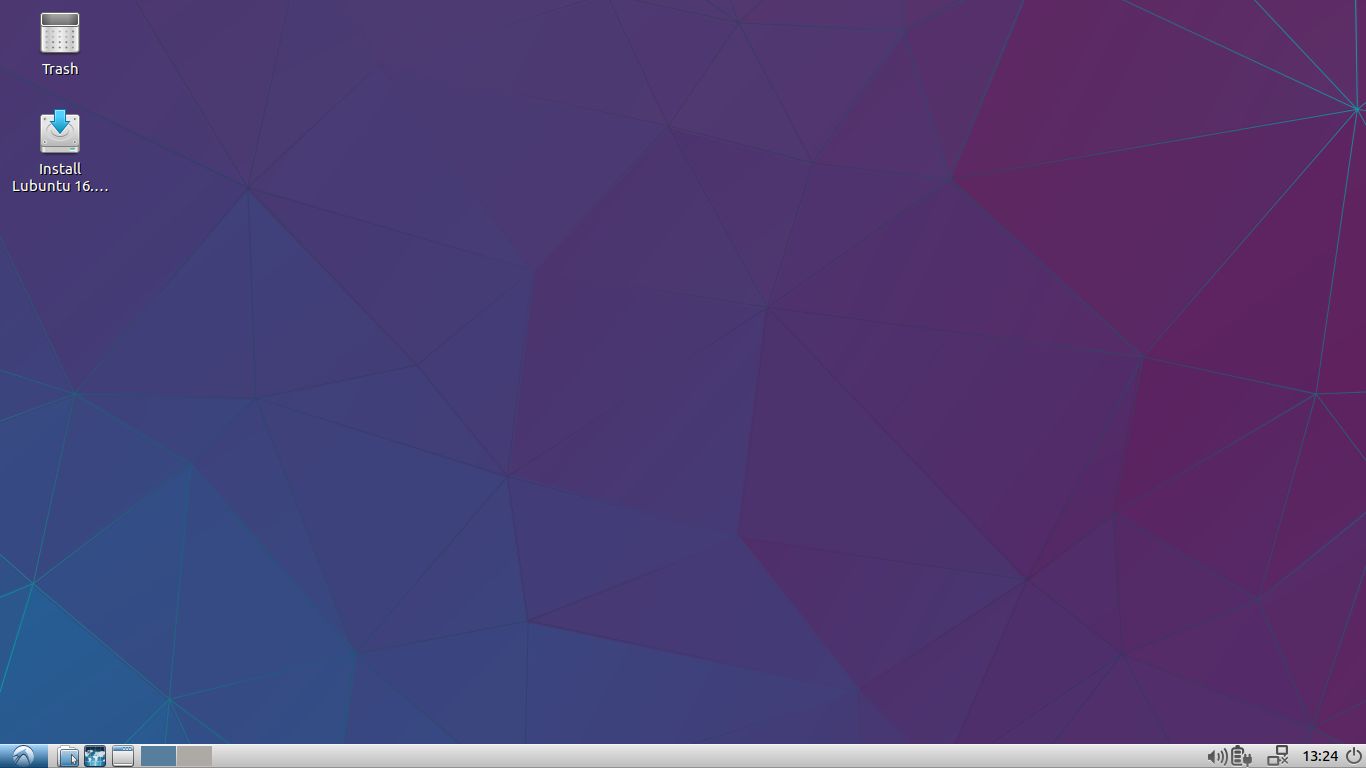
Lubuntu 16.04 LTS

Released on 21 April 2016, Lubuntu 16.04 is a Long Term Support (LTS) version, supported for three years until April 2019. It is the second Lubuntu LTS version, preceded by 14.04 in April 2014.

This release retains the LXDE desktop and did not make the transition to LXQt, to allow LXQt to be better tested in later non-LTS releases.

This release is too large a file to fit on a CD and requires a DVD or USB flash drive installation. Lubuntu 16.04 LTS is primarily a bug-fix release and includes few new features. It does have updated artwork, however. The system requirements include 512 MB of RAM (1 GB recommended) and a Pentium 4, Pentium M, AMD K8 or newer CPU.

The first point release, 16.04.1, was released on 21 July 2016. The release of Lubuntu 16.04.2 was delayed a number of times, but it was eventually released on 17 February 2017. Lubuntu 16.04.3 was released on 3 August 2017. Lubuntu 16.04.4 was delayed from 15 February 2018 and was released on 1 March 2018. Lubuntu 16.04.5 was released on 2 August 2018.

On 8 March 2017 a new version of Firefox, 52.0, arrived through the update process. This version removed ALSA audio support from Firefox in favour of PulseAudio, something initially not mentioned in the Mozilla release notes. Since Lubuntu 16.04 LTS shipped with only ALSA audio, this broke the default Lubuntu audio system in the default Lubuntu browser. In response to a bug filed, Mozilla developers declined to fix the issue.

=== Lubuntu 16.10 ===
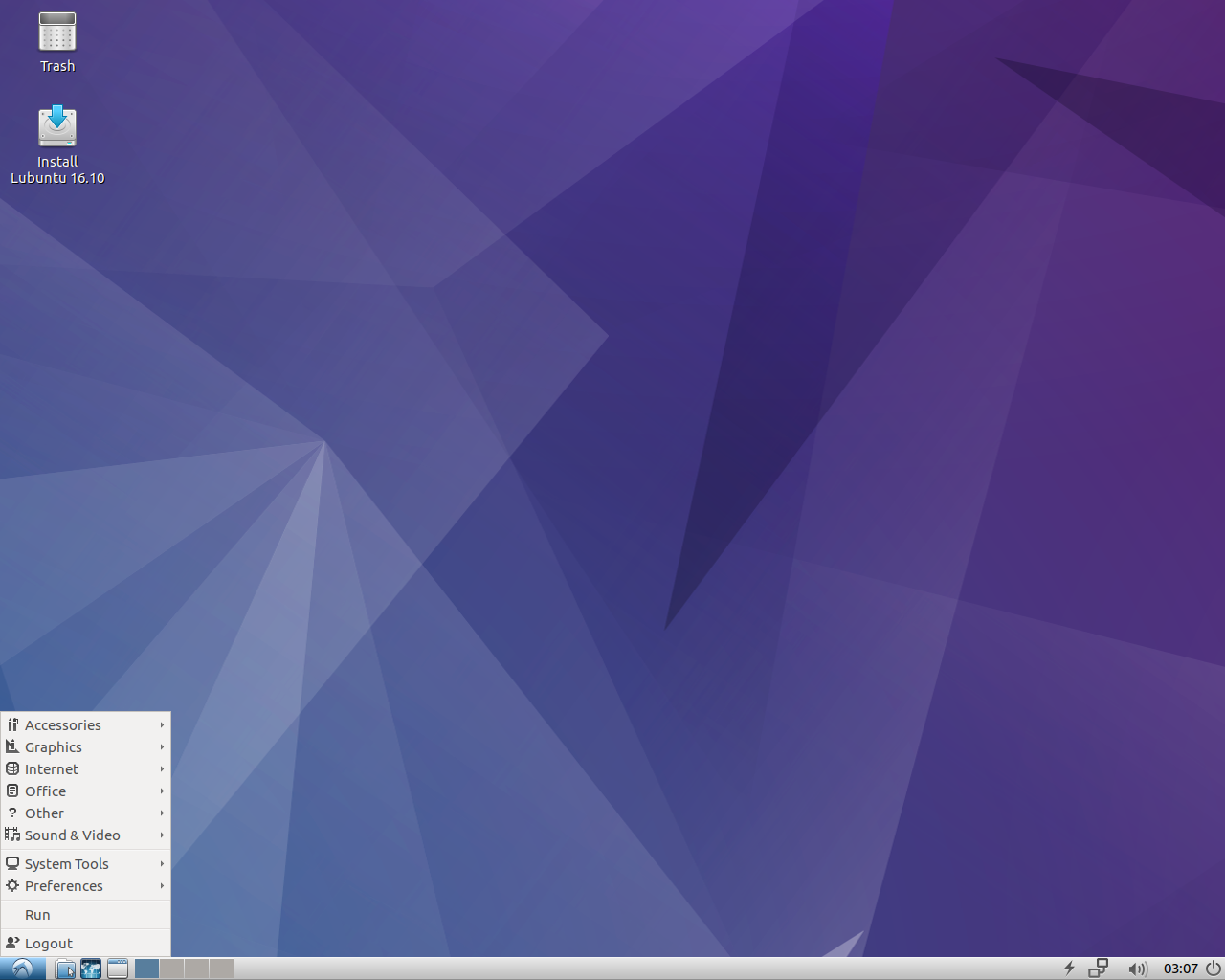
Lubuntu 16.10

Lubuntu 16.10 was released on 13 October 2016. It uses LXDE and not LXQt. The implementation of LXQt was delayed from this release until 17.04.

The release also features just small bug fixes, updated LXDE components and updated artwork, particularly the wallpaper.

The developers' recommended system requirements for this release were, "for advanced internet services like Google+, YouTube, Google Drive, and Facebook, your computer needs at least 1 GB of RAM. For local programs like LibreOffice and simple browsing habits, your computer needs at least 512 MB of RAM. The minimum specification for CPU is Pentium 4 or Pentium M or AMD K8. Older processors are too slow and the AMD K7 has problems with Flash video."

Joey Sneddon of OMG Ubuntu noted that there are very few new features in Lubuntu 16.10, but that it no longer uses the Lubuntu Software Centre, having switched to GNOME Software, as Ubuntu also has. Sneddon wrote, "Lubuntu 16.10 is largely the same as Lubuntu 16.04 LTS as work on switching to the LXQt desktop – expected next release – continues." In a July 2016 article, Sneddon singled out the new wallpaper design for Lubuntu 16.10, saying, "the jaggedy geometric layout of the new backdrop stands out as one of the more visually distinct to ship in recent years".

Marius Nestor of Softpedia wrote: "it appears that there are a lot of known issues for this release, so if you're using Lubuntu 16.04 LTS (Xenial Xerus), we don't recommend upgrading to Lubuntu 16.10, or at least read about them before attempting an upgrade operation."

=== Lubuntu 17.04 ===
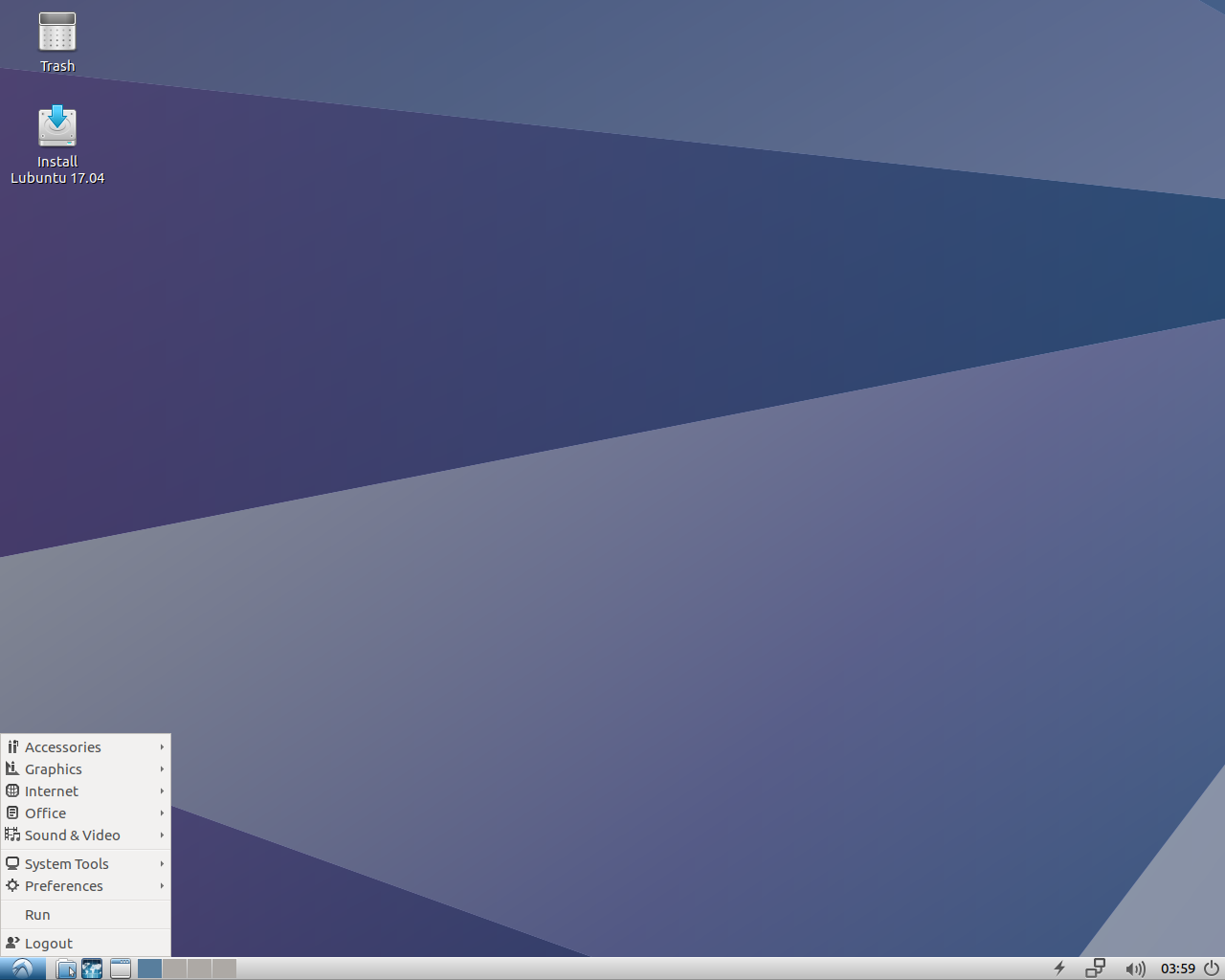
Lubuntu 17.04

Lubuntu 17.04 was released on 13 April 2017. Like previous releases it uses LXDE and not LXQt, as the implementation of LXQt in Lubuntu was delayed once again, this time until 17.10.

This release incorporated Linux Kernel 4.10, updated LXDE components, general bug fixes and new artwork. The recommended system requirements included 1 GB of RAM (512 MB minimum) and a minimum of a Pentium 4, Pentium M or AMD K8 processor.

Joey Sneddon of OMG Ubuntu said of this release, that it is "compromised [sic] mainly of bug fixes and core app and system updates rather than screenshot-able new features."

=== Lubuntu 17.10 ===
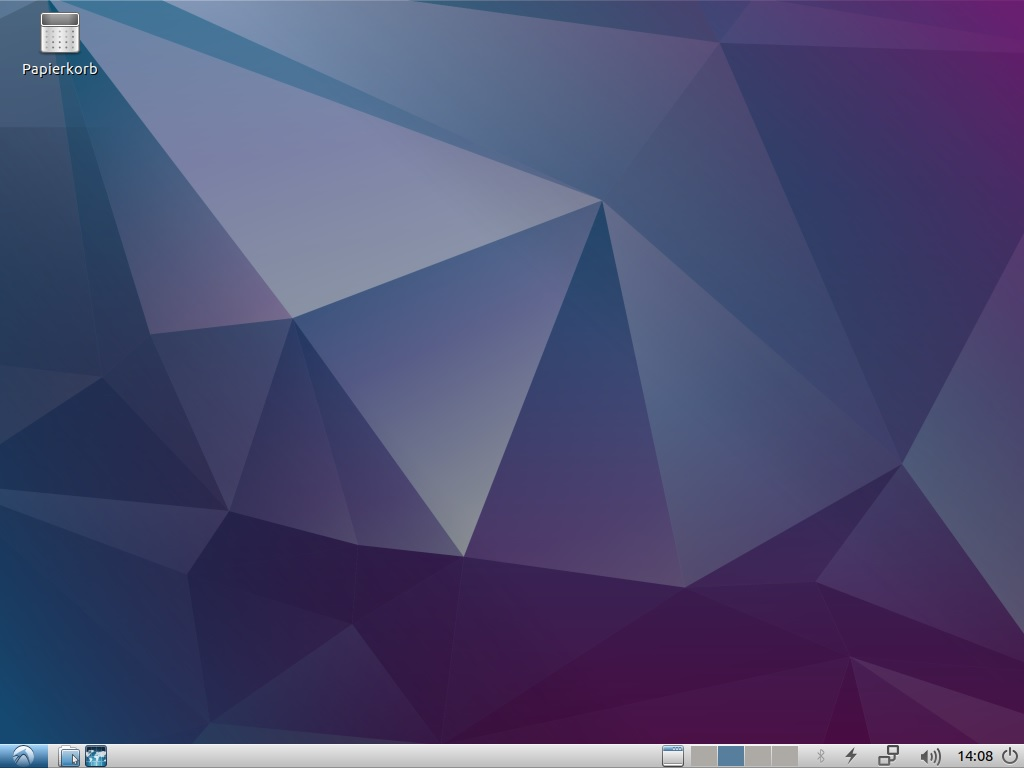
Lubuntu 17.10

Lubuntu 17.10 was released on 19 October 2017.

This release was a general bug fix release as the project prepares for the implementation of LXQt. Also included were new versions of the LXDE components and new artwork. The minimum system requirements for this release remained 512 MB of RAM (with 1 GB recommended) and at least a Pentium 4, Pentium M or AMD K8 processor.

An alternate version entitled Lubuntu Next 17.10 was provided with the LXQt 0.11.1 desktop. "While this release is available to install... we do NOT recommend that people use it in production unless they are aware of the somewhat critical bugs associated (which are more than 10 at the point of writing this). It also wouldn't be a bad idea to be in contact with us as well," wrote Lubuntu developer Simon Quigley.

=== Lubuntu 18.04 LTS ===
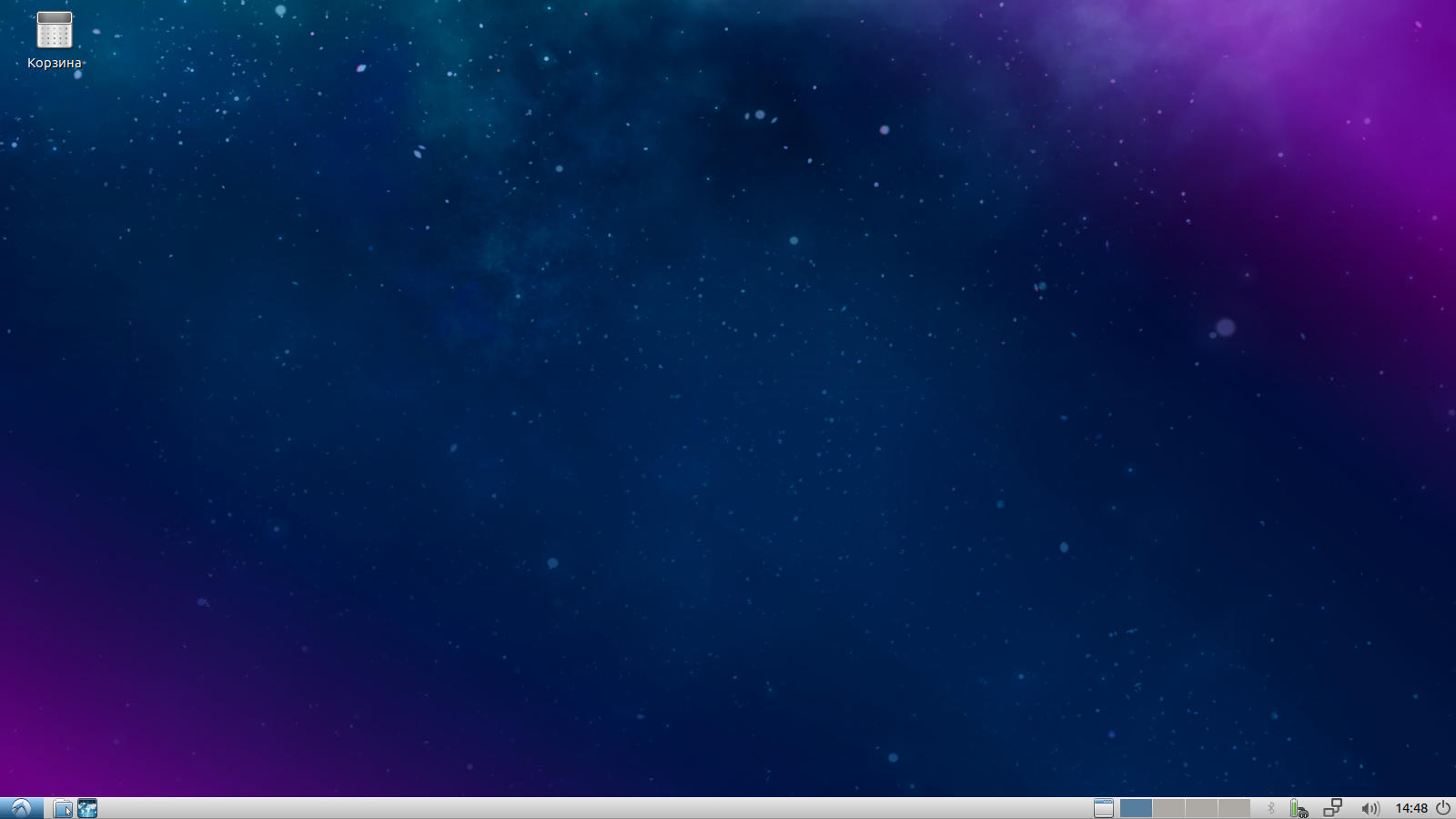
Lubuntu 18.04 LTS

Lubuntu 18.04 is a long term support version that was released on 26 April 2018. Like all past releases, it uses the LXDE desktop, although work continued to move towards deployment of the LXQt desktop, referred to as Lubuntu Next. 18.04 was the last release of Lubuntu to use the LXDE desktop as 18.10 moved to using LXQt.

This release included new artwork, including a new star field wallpaper.

System requirements for Lubuntu 18.04 LTS included a minimum of 1 GB of RAM, although 2 GB was recommended for better performance, plus a Pentium 4, Pentium M, or AMD K8 CPU or newer. The RAM requirements increased from Lubuntu 17.10.

Point releases include 18.04.1 on 26 July 2018 and 18.04.2 on 14 February 2019.

=== Lubuntu 18.10 ===
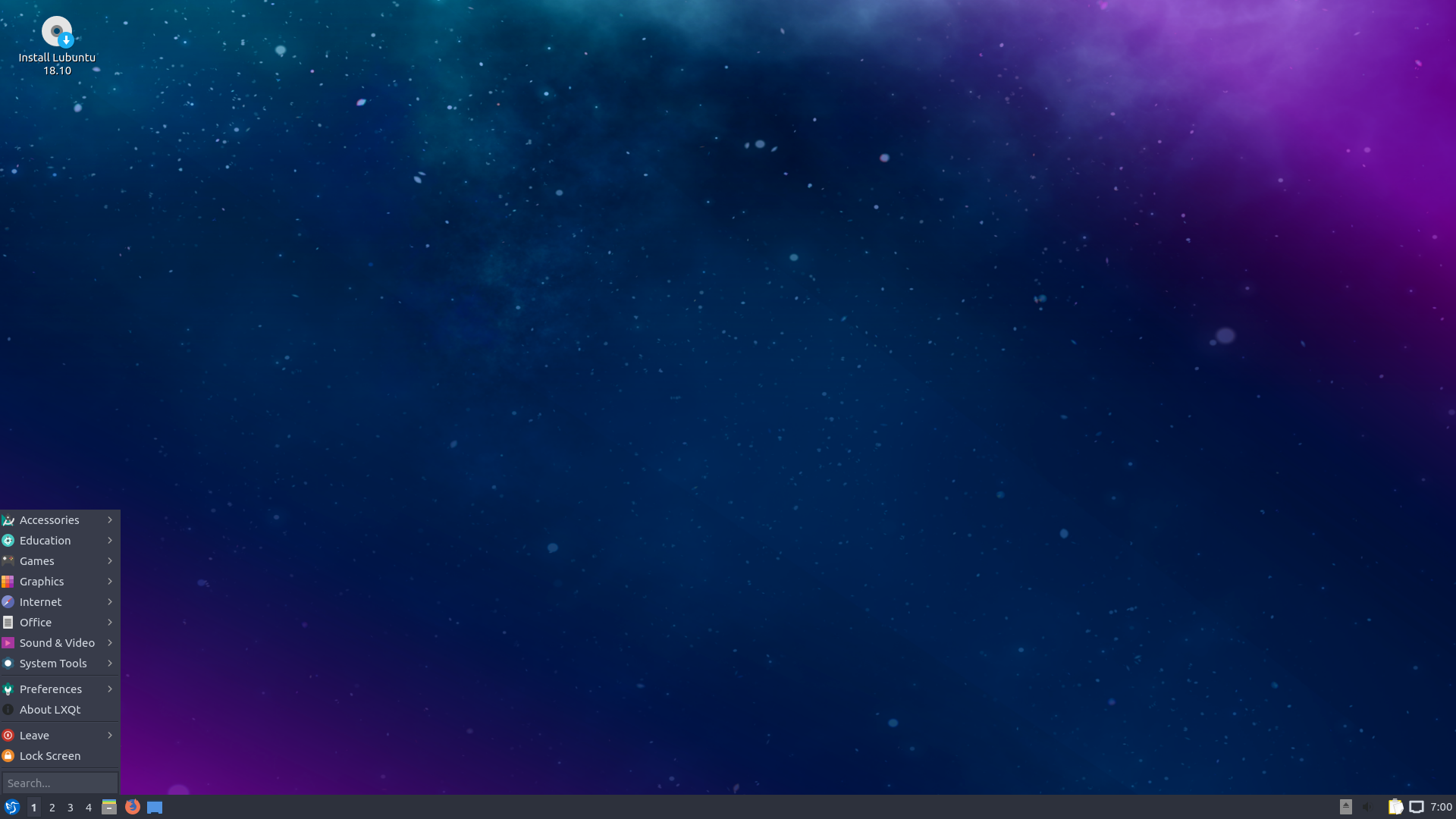
Lubuntu 18.10

In a 14 May 2018 announcement the project developers confirmed that Lubuntu would transition to the LXQt desktop for Lubuntu 18.10. It was released on 18 October 2018 and included LXQt. This transition was planned for after the release of Lubuntu 18.04 LTS, to allow testing and development over three regular releases before the first long term support version, Lubuntu 20.04 LTS, is released with LXQt. The project also changed its logo in early April 2018, in anticipation of this move.

In transitioning to LXQt this release uses LXQt 0.13.0, based upon Qt 5.11.1. Applications include LibreOffice 6.1.1 office suite, the VLC media player 3.0.4 player, Discover Software Center 5.13.5 and FeatherPad 0.9.0 text editor. KDE's Falkon 3.0.1 had been beta tested as the default web browser, but was found to lack stability and was replaced with Firefox 63.0.

The installer for 18.10 is the Calamares system installer, in place of the previous Ubiquity installer.

Starting with this release the developers no longer make recommendations for minimum system requirements.

In reviewing the beta version of 18.10 in May 2018, Marius Nestor of Softpedia wrote: "We took the first Lubuntu 18.10 daily build with LXQt for a test drive, and we have to say that we're impressed... The layout is very simple, yet stylish with a sleek dark theme by default and a single panel at the bottom of the screen from where you can access everything you need... we give it a five-star rating."

Writing after the official release on 20 October 2018, Marius Nestor of Softpedia noted: "After many trials and tribulations, and a lot of hard work, the Lubuntu team finally managed to ship a release with the LXQt desktop environment by default instead of LXDE (Lightweight X11 Desktop Environment), which was used by default on all Lubuntu releases from the beginning of the project. We also believe LXQt is the future of the LXDE desktop environment, which uses old and soon deprecated technologies, so we welcome Lubuntu 18.10 (Cosmic Cuttlefish) with its shiny LXQt 0.13.0 desktop environment by default, built against the latest Qt 5.11.1 libraries and patched with upstream's improvements."

In reviewing Lubuntu 18.10, DistroWatch's Jesse Smith wrote: "I have mixed feelings about this release of Lubuntu. On the one hand most of the features worked well. The distribution was easy to install, I liked the theme, and the operating system is pretty easy to use. There were a few aspects I didn't like, usually programs or settings modules I felt were overly complex or confusing compared to their counterparts on other distributions. For the most part though, Lubuntu does a nice job of being a capable, relatively lightweight distribution... On the whole, I think the transition from LXDE to LXQt has gone smoothly. There are a few choices I didn't like, and a few I did, but mostly the changes were minor. I think most people will be able to make the leap between the two desktops fairly easily. I think a few settings modules still need polish and I'd like to see Discover replaced with just about any other modern software manager, but otherwise this felt like a graceful (and mostly positive) move from 18.04 to 18.10 and from LXDE to LXQt."

A detailed review of Lubuntu 18.10, Mahmudin Asharin, writing in Ubuntu Buzz, found only a few faults in the release, in particular the network manager. He concluded, "For most users, I recommend Lubuntu 18.04 LTS instead for the sake of usability and support duration. For first timer who installed/want to install 18.10 LXQt, go ahead and you will get beautiful user interface and very nice experience, but I recommend you to use Wicd instead of default network manager. For LXQt desktop pursuer, Lubuntu 18.10 is a great example of LXQt system. Try it first."

A review in Full Circle magazine noted, "Overall LXQt, as seen in Lubuntu 18.10, is ready for day-to-day use, while there is also still room for ongoing refinement. Introducing LXQt in Lubuntu 18.10 was a careful choice by the Lubuntu developers. Coming right after Lubuntu 18.04 LTS, the final LXDE release, it gives developers three "standard" releases to continue to polish LXQt before the first LTS release..."

=== Lubuntu 19.04 ===
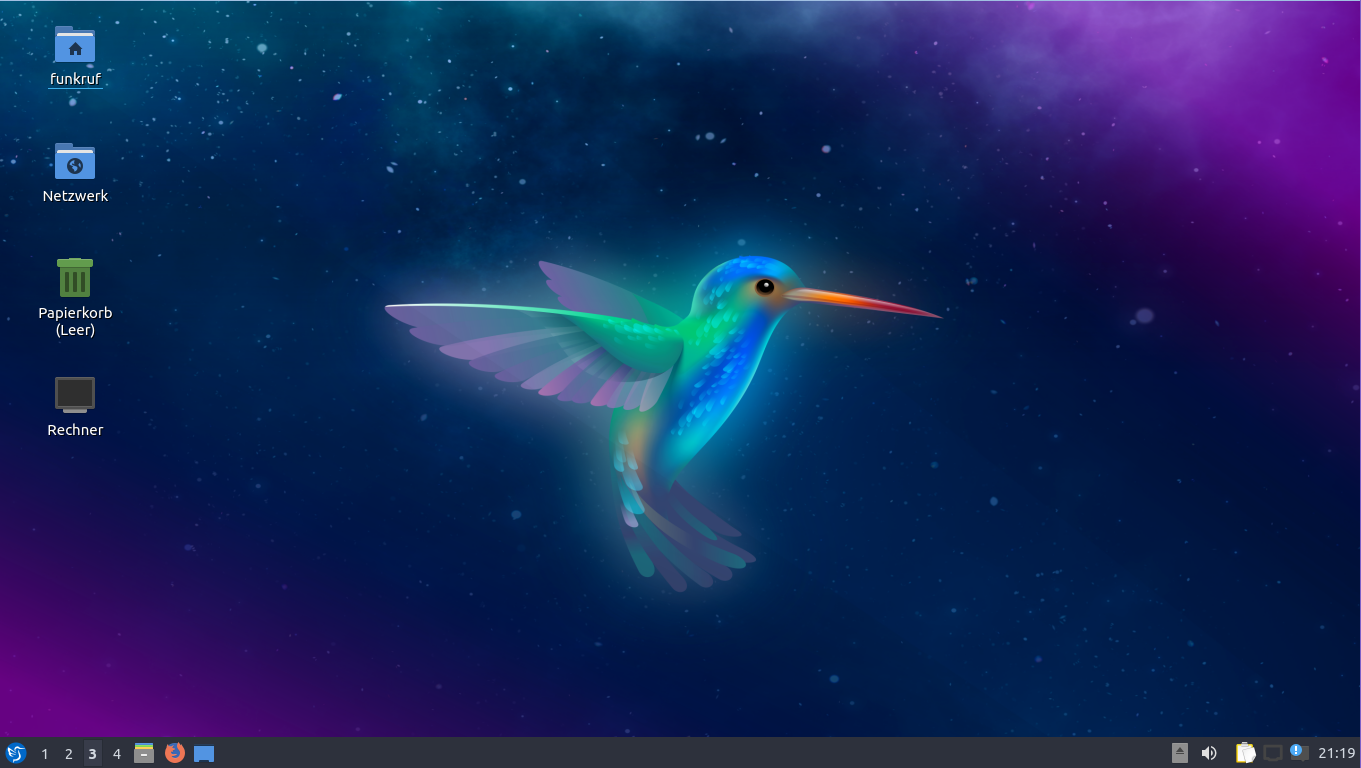
Lubuntu 19.04

This standard release was made on schedule on 18 April 2019.

This release marked the first Lubuntu version without 32-bit support. Lubuntu developer Simon Quigley wrote in December 2018:

As an increasing number of Linux distributions have focused their attention on the 64-bit x86 architecture (amd64) and not on i386, we have found that it is harder to support than it once was. With i386-only machines becoming an artifact of the past, it has become increasingly clear to the Lubuntu Team that we need to evaluate its removal from the architectures we support. After careful consideration, we regret to inform our users that Lubuntu 19.04 and future versions will not see a release for the i386 architecture. Please do note that we will continue to support Lubuntu 18.04 LTS i386 users as a first-class citizen until its End of Life date in April of 2021.

This release featured LXQt 0.14.1, based upon Qt 5.12.2. It included working full-disk encryption, easier customization of the Calamares installer configurations by employing XDG configuration variables and Austrian keymapping. Minimum installation RAM was reduced to 500 MB. Other changes include Trash, Home, Computer, and Network icons added to the desktop, split view in PCManFM-Qt, exif data display in the image viewer, LXImage-Qt and touchpad settings fixed over 18.10.

In a review Softpedia writer Marius Nestor described the use of LXQt 0.14.1, employed in Lubuntu 19.04, as "a much-improved and richer LXQt experience".

A review in Full Circle magazine concluded, "Lubuntu 18.10 wasn't ready for prime time, but 19.04 is. LXQt looks fresh and new, and everything works right from the installation; it even runs fine from a DVD live session. I didn't find anything that needs fixing in 19.04. If not for the nine-month support period for this regular release, it could have been a long term support release, at least for the quality of the user experience and the lack of bugs."

A review in FOSS Post by M. Hanny Subbagh in September 2019, entitled Lubuntu, A Once Great Distro, Is Falling Behind concluded "Most of the criticism you have seen in this article is coming from the LXQt desktop environment. It's understandable that any new piece of software will have bugs/issues in the first few years of its life cycle, but the LXQt desktop still needs a long round of polished updated to make it match the other desktops such as GNOME, Cinnamon, XFCE and MATE. Meanwhile, if you are interested in trying Lubuntu, we recommend that you stick to the 18.04LTS version, which comes with LXDE."

A review by Igor Ljubuncic in Dedoimedo concluded, "Lubuntu 19.04 Disco Dingo feels...raw. Unfinished. Half-baked. It has some perfectly decent functionality, like networking, media and phone support, but then it also comes with rudimentary package management, a jumbled arsenal of programs, a desktop that is too difficult to manage and tame, plus identity crisis... I struggled with the overall purpose, though. As impressive as the speed and lightness are, they are only small improvements over what Plasma offers. But then, Plasma is much easier to customize and tweak, it offers a coherent, consistent experience, and it feels modern and relevant. With Lubuntu, I had no connection, and using the distro felt like a chore. I had to fight the weird defaults to try to create an efficient setup, and I wasn't able to do achieve that. So I always go back to the question of investment versus benefit. Lubuntu feels too pricey for what it gives... With Lubuntu, there needs to be more order, more consistency in how it works. At the moment, it's just a collection of ideas mashed together. While perfectly functional, it's not really fun. 6/10..."

=== Lubuntu 19.10 ===
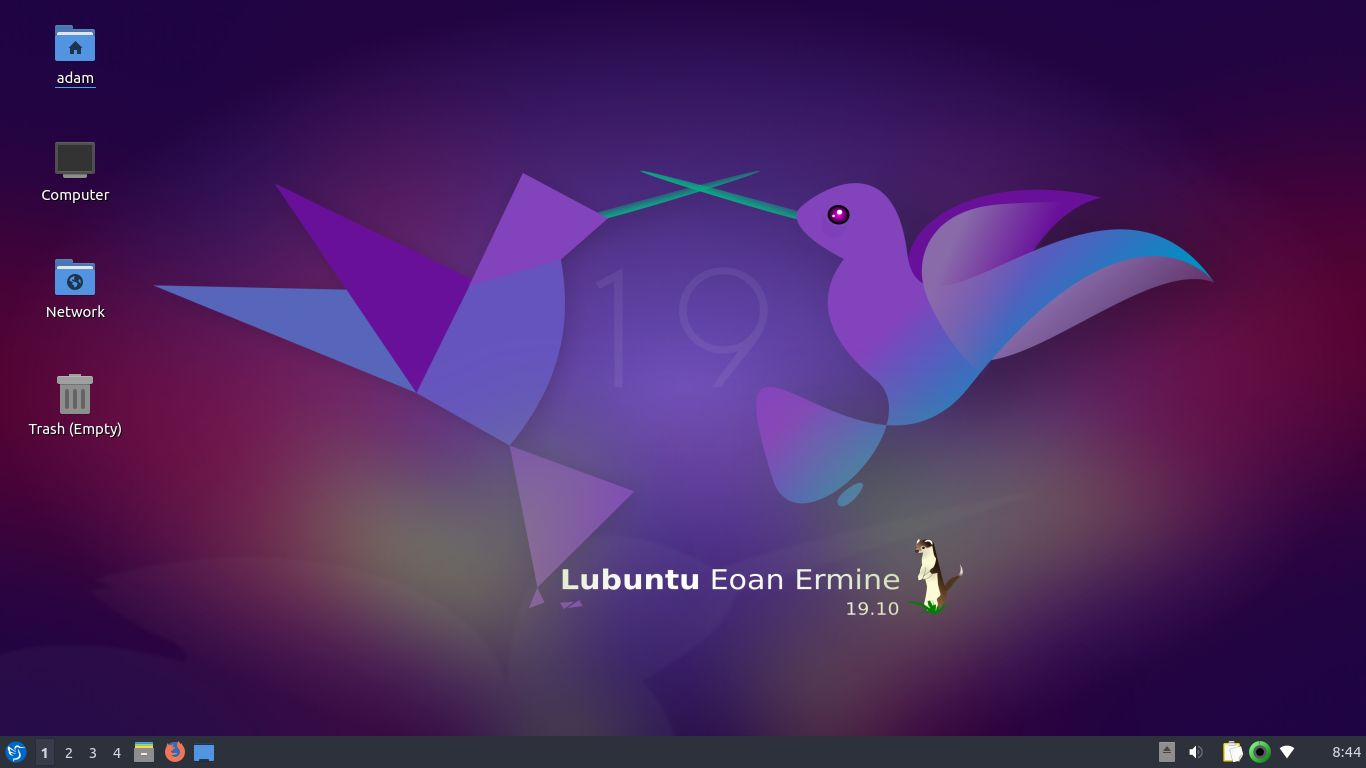
Lubuntu 19.10

This standard release was the last one before the 20.04 LTS release and arrived on 17 October 2019.

This release brought new artwork, including new wallpaper. It uses LXQt 0.14.1, based upon Qt 5.12.4.

A review in the February 2020 issue of Full Circle magazine, concluded, "Lubuntu 19.10 builds well upon the success of 19.04. The developers seem to be fixing things at a good clip and polishing it up for the next key release, the first LXQt LTS version, due out on 23 April 2020. The 19.10 release is bug-free enough to have been an LTS release itself and this bodes really well for the expected quality of the upcoming LTS."

=== Lubuntu 20.04 LTS ===
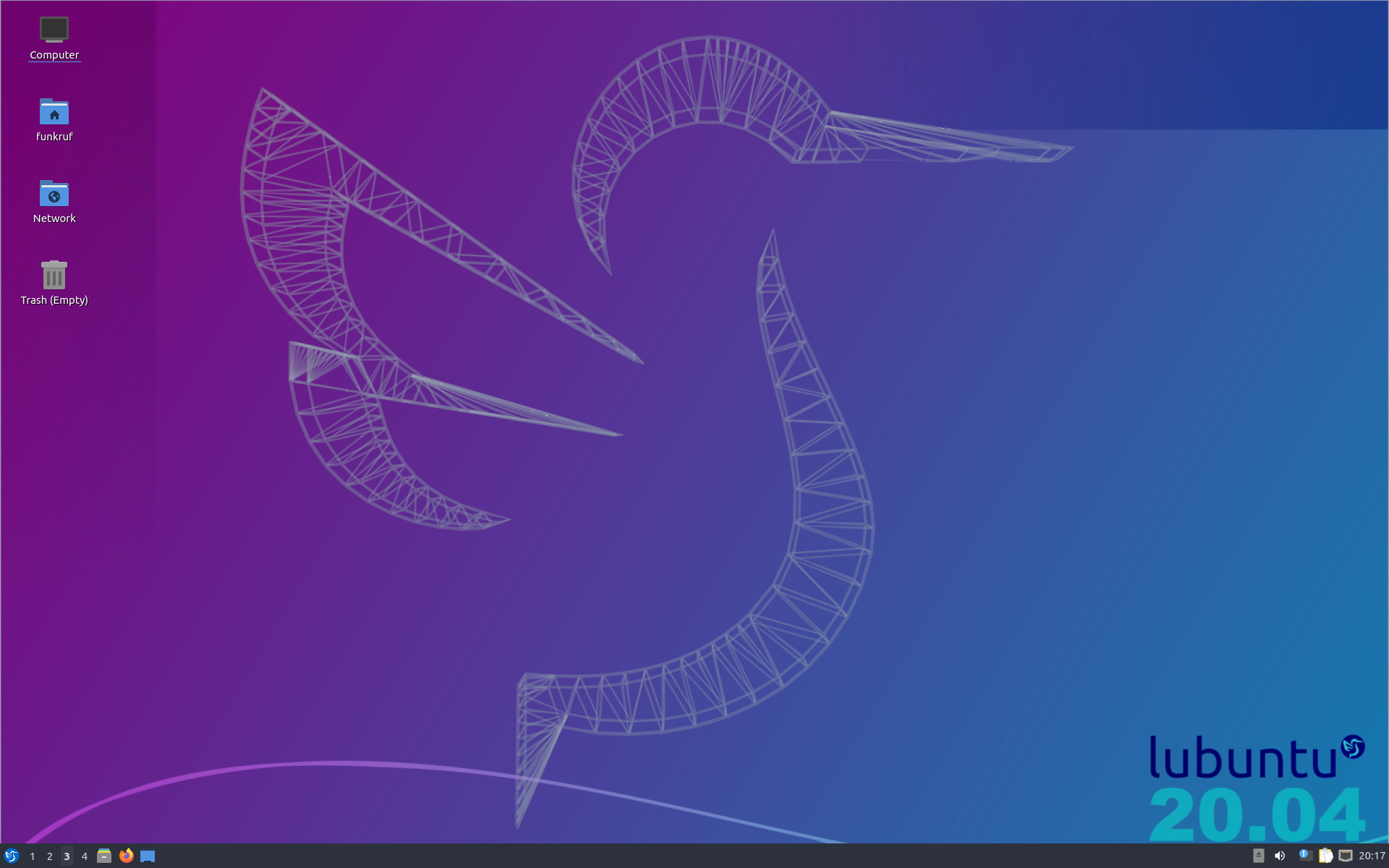
Lubuntu 20.04 LTS

This release is the first Lubuntu long term support release that uses LXQt and was released on 23 April 2020. Lubuntu 20.04.1 LTS was released on 6 August 2020.

Lubuntu 20.04 LTS used LXQt 0.14.1, based upon Qt 5.12.8 LTS. This release did not introduce many changes. It included a new software update notifier application. Called Update Notifier, it was developed by Hans Möller. The release included new wallpaper artwork as a result of a community contest held for the release.

In a 27 April 2020 review in It's FOSS, Dimitrios Savvopoulos noted, "LXQt is not only for users with an older hardware but also for those who are seeking a simple and classic experience at their new machine." He added, "in daily use, Lubuntu 20.04 has proven to me completely trouble-free as every Ubuntu flavour in fact...[the] Lubuntu team has successfully made the transition to a modern, still lightweight and minimal desktop environment. LXDE looks like [it has been] abandoned and it is a good thing to move away [from it] to an active project.

A 29 May 2020 review in Full Circle magazine concluded, "Lubuntu 20.04 LTS completes the two-year development cycle, consisting of three standard releases leading to this LTS release. Overall this represents the culmination of a development project that commenced in 2014 to create a new Qt-based desktop for Lubuntu: LXQt. The process has taken much longer than was forecast six years ago, but was worth the wait. This first LTS release is stable, smooth, elegant, and a real joy to use. This is the best Lubuntu release so far."

=== Lubuntu 20.10 ===
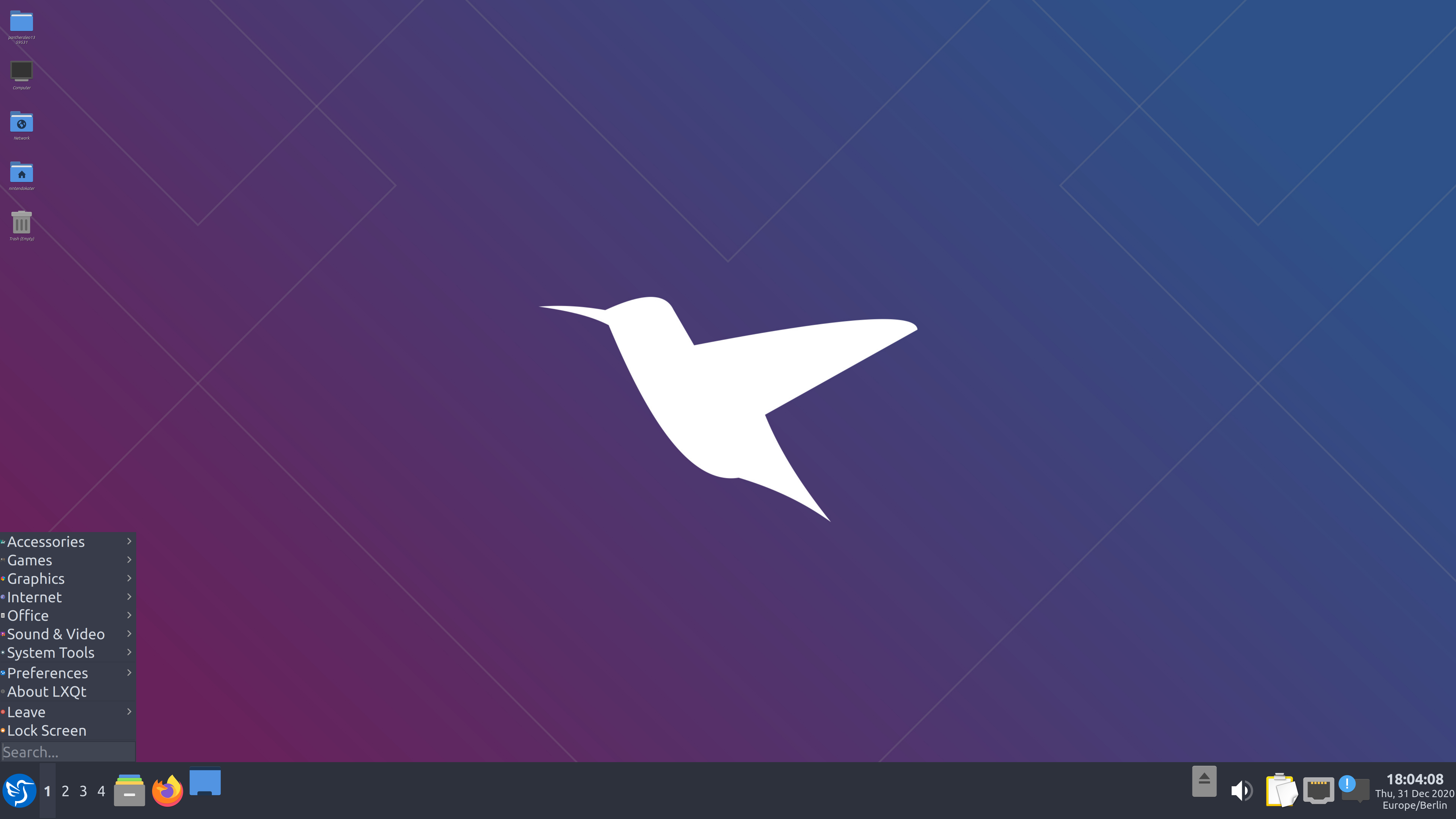
Lubuntu 20.10

This standard release was made available on 22 October 2020.

This release used LXQt 0.15.0, based on Qt 5.14.2. Improvements include adding a tree view to show pending updates in the Lubuntu update notifier and an updated plymouth theme, with the default wallpaper an alternate one from the 20.04 wallpaper competition.

In a rundown on the Ubuntu flavors, DeBugPoint noted, "Lubuntu 20.10 based on Groovy Gorilla...is perfect for low-end hardware and lightweight systems while being stable [due to being based upon] Ubuntu".

A review published on Christmas Day 2020 in Full Circle magazine concluded, "Lubuntu 20.10 introduces very little that is new over 20.04 LTS. I actually think this is a good sign, as 20.04 LTS is a superb operating system and doesn't really need much improvement. If this development cycle leads to the next Lubuntu LTS version having just a few minor improvements over 20.04, then, personally, I will be very happy with the results. An updated version of FeatherPad would be nice by then, however."

=== Lubuntu 21.04 ===
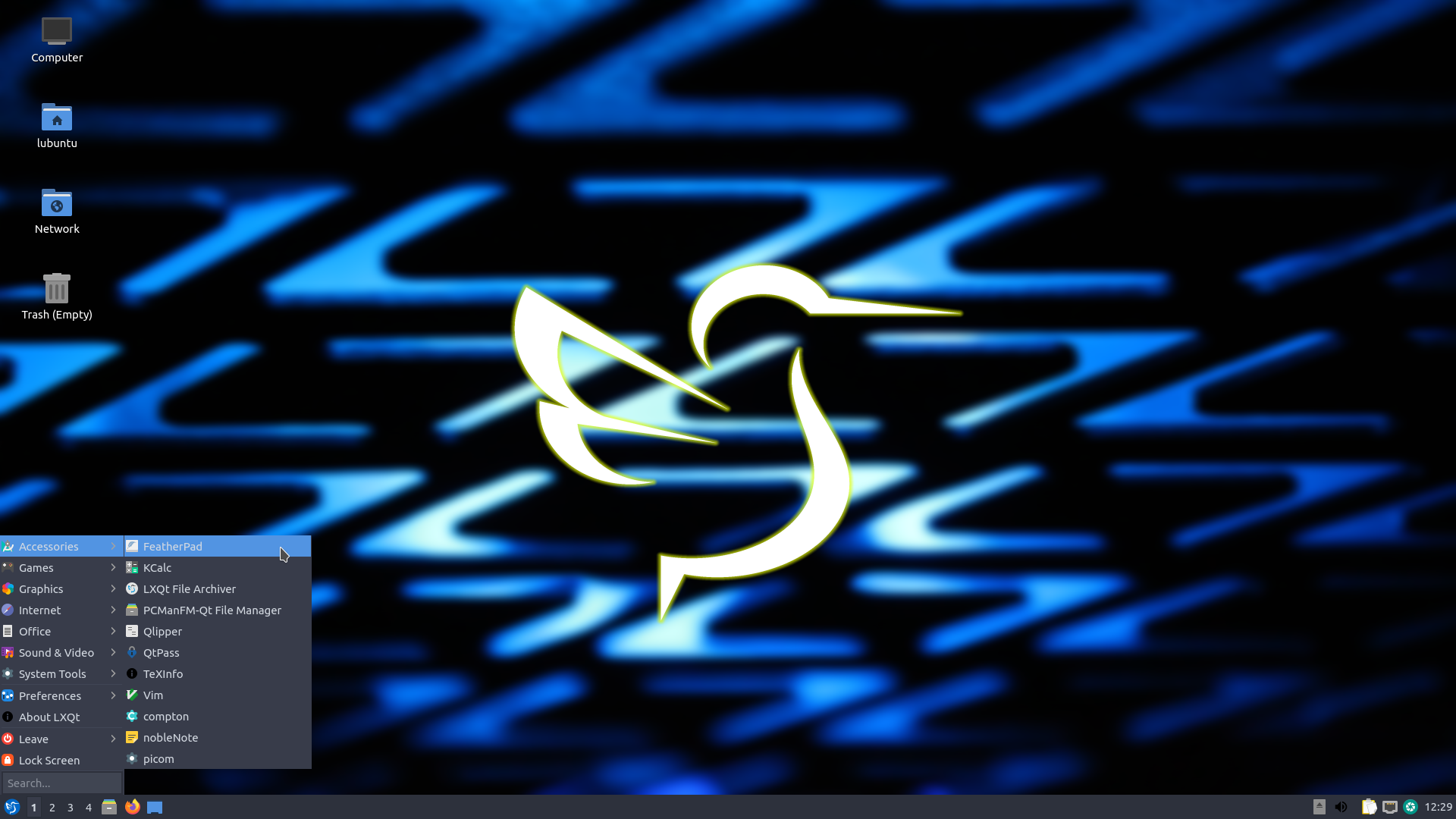
Lubuntu 21.04

Lubuntu 21.04 is a standard release, made on 22 April 2021.

This version introduced LXQt 0.16.0 based upon Qt 5.15.2. A new application, LXQt Archiver 0.3.0, based on Engrampa, was included. There was also a new version of the Lubuntu update notifier that includes a tree view with packages and versions for upgrade listed, plus new artwork.

A review in Full Circle magazine stated, "this second standard release in the development cycle leading to the next LTS includes just small, cautious changes. This is really how operating system development should be approached, particularly when you have a loyal user base who are happy with how everything works and are generally not demanding big changes."

=== Lubuntu 21.10 ===
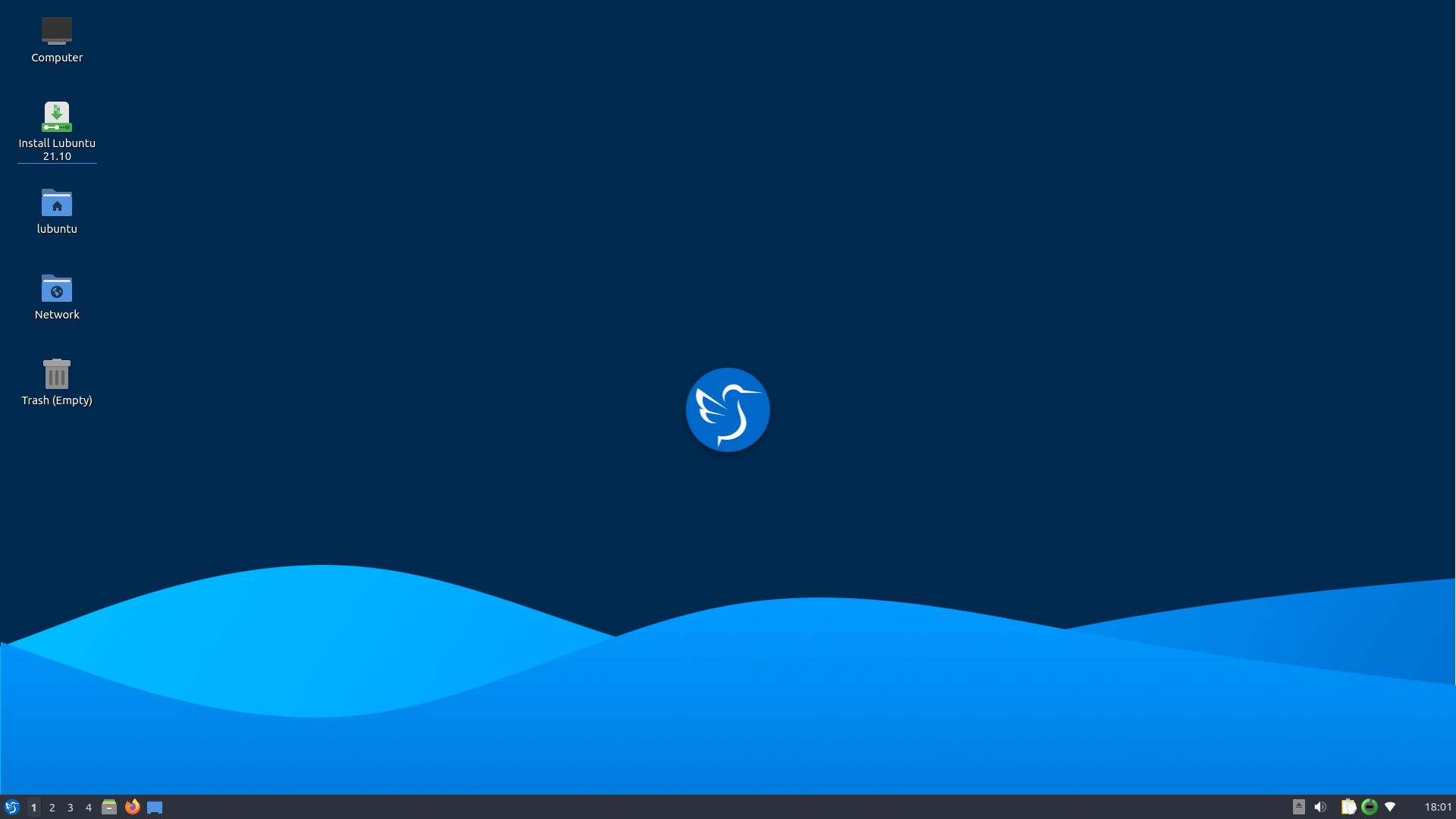
Lubuntu 21.10

Lubuntu 21.10 is a standard release that was released on 14 October 2021.

This release uses the LXQt 0.17.0 desktop, based on Qt 5.15.2. Unlike Ubuntu 21.10, which moved to a snap package, Lubuntu retained the .deb package for the Firefox browser for this release.

A Full Circle magazine review concluded, "Lubuntu 21.10 is a good, solid release without any bad points. With its well-polished LXQt desktop, it is smooth, intuitive and easy to use."

=== Lubuntu 22.04 LTS ===
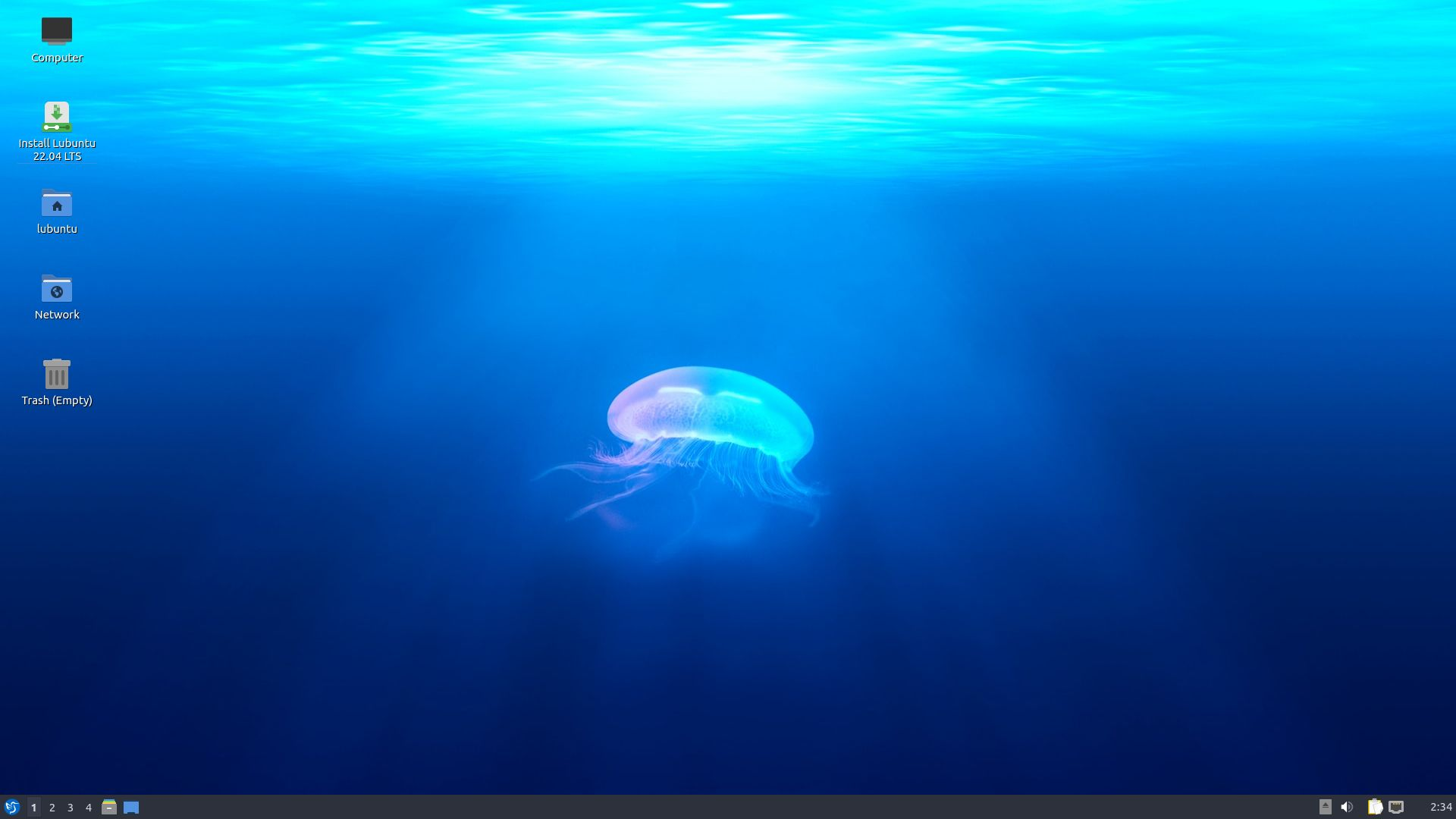
Lubuntu 22.04 LTS

Lubuntu 22.04 LTS is a long term support release, made on 21 April 2022 and will be supported for three years until April 2025.

This releases employs the LXQt 0.17.0 desktop, based on Qt 5.15.3. It introduces the use of the Firefox web browser as a snap package, as the .deb package was removed from the Ubuntu repositories. Other changes include the deletion of the Trojitá email client, the K3B CD/DVD burning application and the fcitx input method framework.

A review in Debug Point noted of this release, "overall, a perfect update of Lubuntu since the last LTS version, considering the latest LXQt desktop with the latest Qt support, new installer, Discover software manager and underlying applications."

=== Lubuntu 22.10 ===
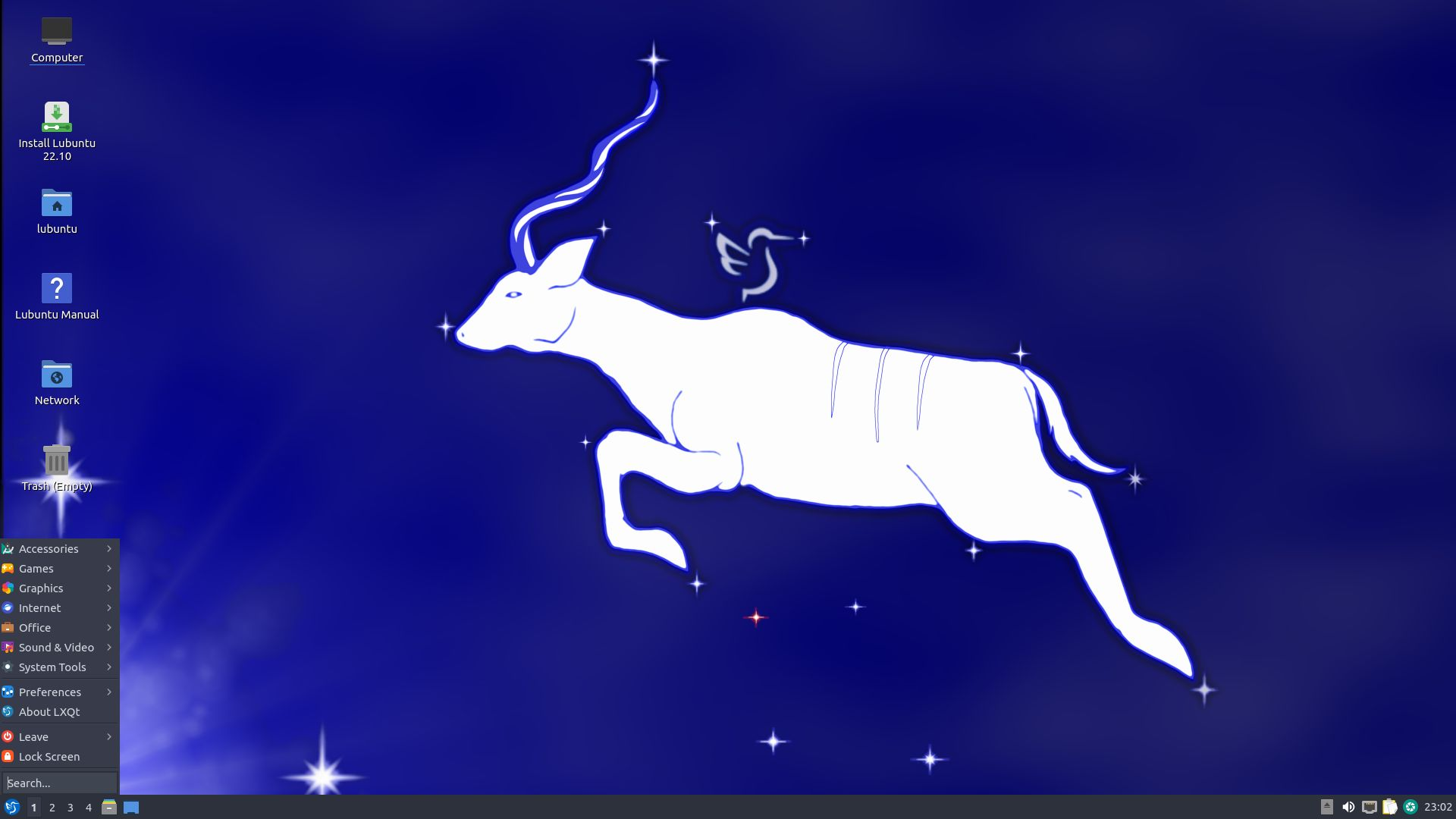
Lubuntu 22.10

Lubuntu 22.10, an interim release, was made on 20 October 2022.

This release uses LXQt 1.1.0, which is based upon the Qt 5.15.6 toolkit. It also has the Calamares 3.3 Alpha 2 installer, Linux kernel 5.19 and new artwork.

A review by Jeff Siegel in DistroWatch concluded that Lubuntu 22.10 is, "a top-notch and professional distro that doesn't get in the way. In this, I think Lubuntu has found a niche currently filled by Chromebooks, but for users who want more privacy and more control over their system – and who don't want to pay for new hardware. Lubuntu is more nimble than a low-end Chromebook, less irritating to use, and installation bears no comparison to Google's Chrome OS brain whacking."

=== Lubuntu 23.04 ===
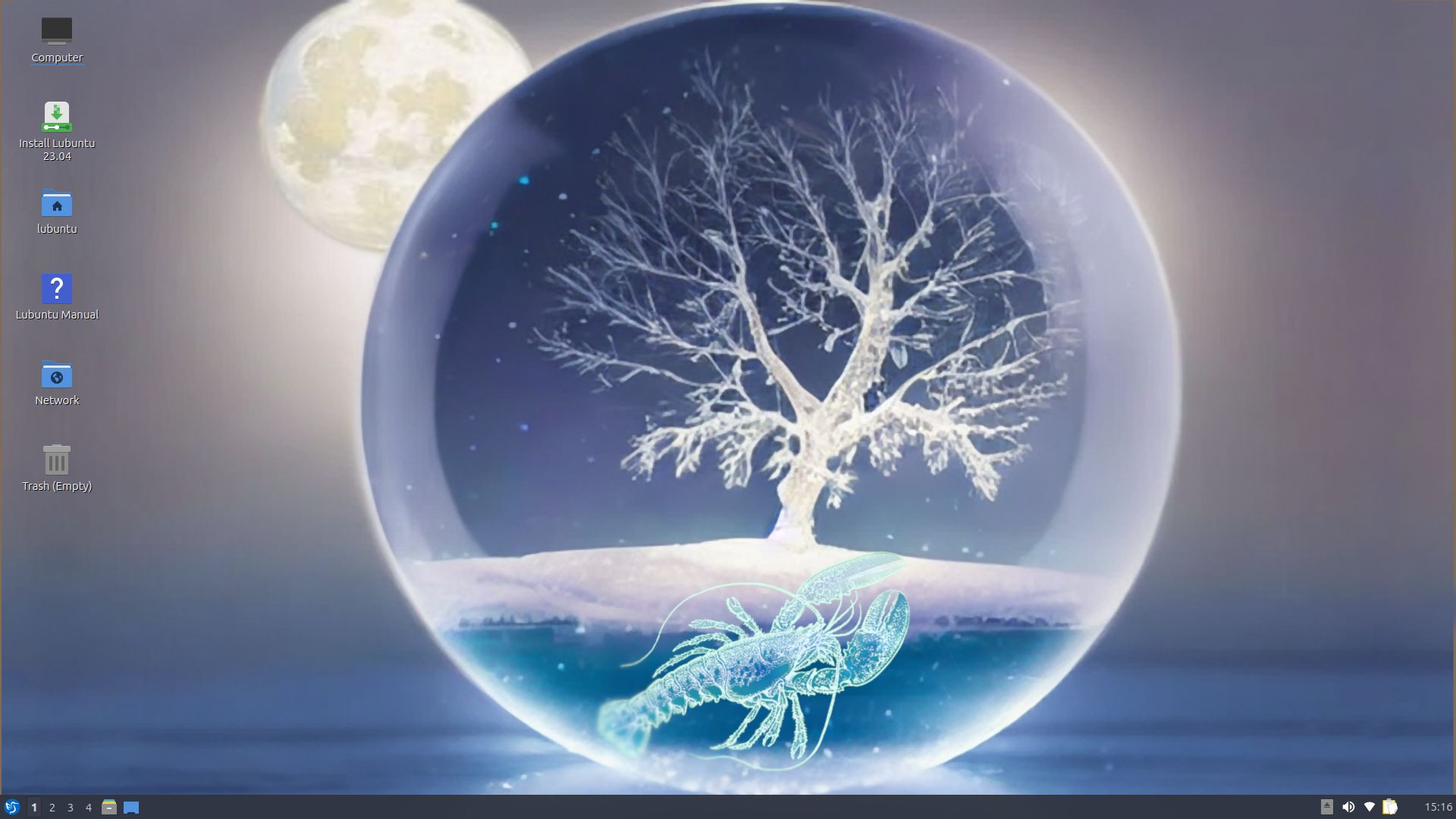
Lubuntu 23.04

Lubuntu 23.04 is an interim release that was made on 20 April 2023.

This release comes with LXQt version 1.2.0, based upon Qt 5.15.8, with a few components from LXQt 1.2.1. PipeWire replaces PulseAudio as the audio system controller and Picom is the new X compositor, enabled by default. It continues to use the Calamares 3.3 Alpha 2 installer.

Support for Lubuntu 23.04 ended on 25 January 2024.

=== Lubuntu 23.10 ===
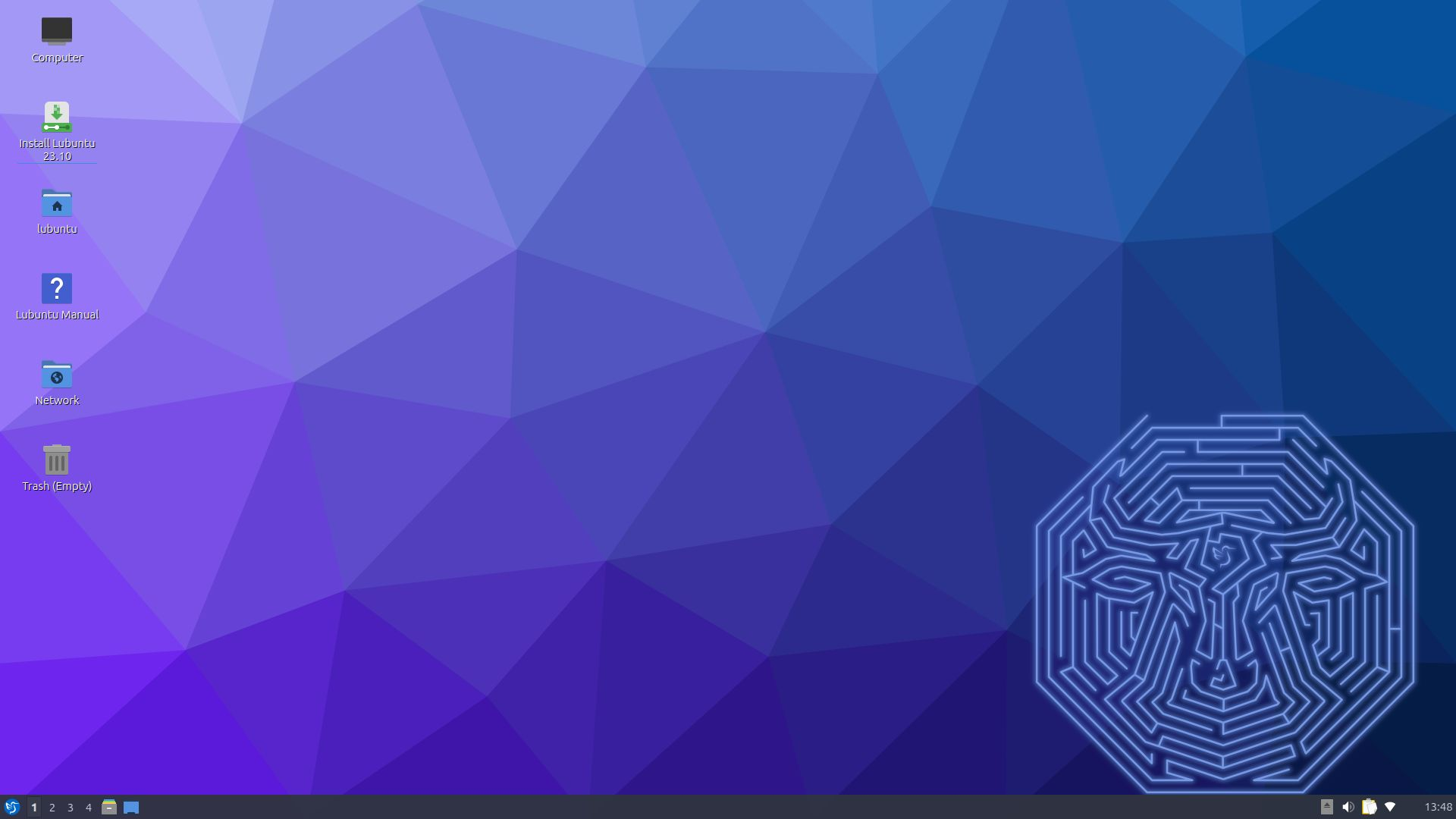
Lubuntu 23.10

Lubuntu 23.10 is an interim release that was made on 12 October 2023 and supported for nine months until July 2024.

It notably features LXQt 1.3.0 and Qt 5.15.10, with a backports repository featuring LXQt 1.4.0 released on 16 November 2023.

=== Lubuntu 24.04 LTS ===
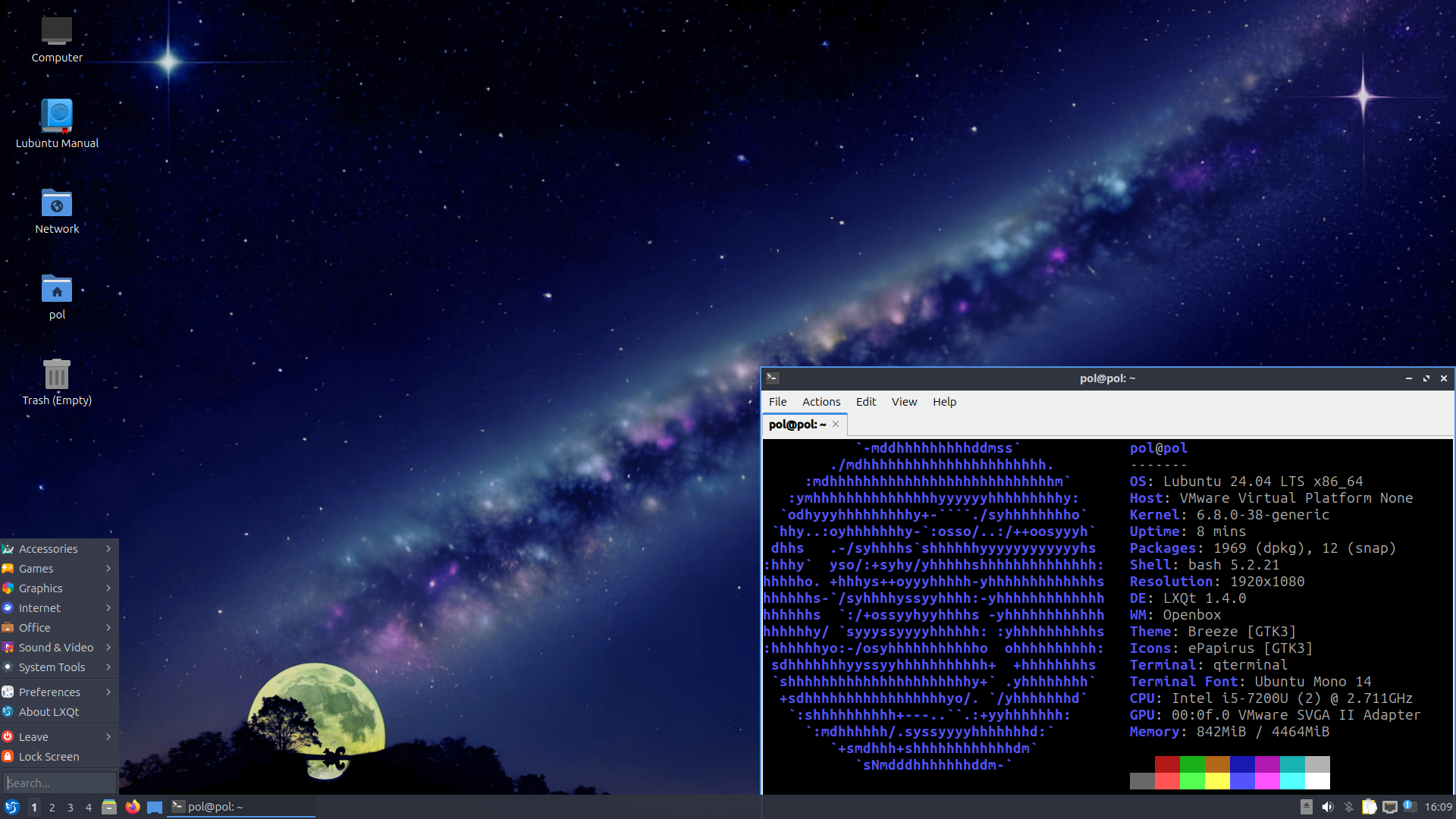
Lubuntu 24.04 LTS

Lubuntu 24.04 is an LTS version, released on 25 April 2024. Support provided until April 2027.

Lubuntu 24.04 makes a number of changes to the system installer, including an 'installer prompt' page, the ability to choose additional applications and updates and an OEM Installation Mode. Lubuntu 24.04 also features a number of application and utility updates, including the Blueman Bluetooth manager, a login screen configuration editor, a software updater, Redshift for configuring 'night light' and a compositor configuration tool.

Lubuntu ships with LXQt 1.4.0 and Qt 5.15.13. The size of the ISO file is 3.07 GB.

=== Lubuntu 24.10 ===
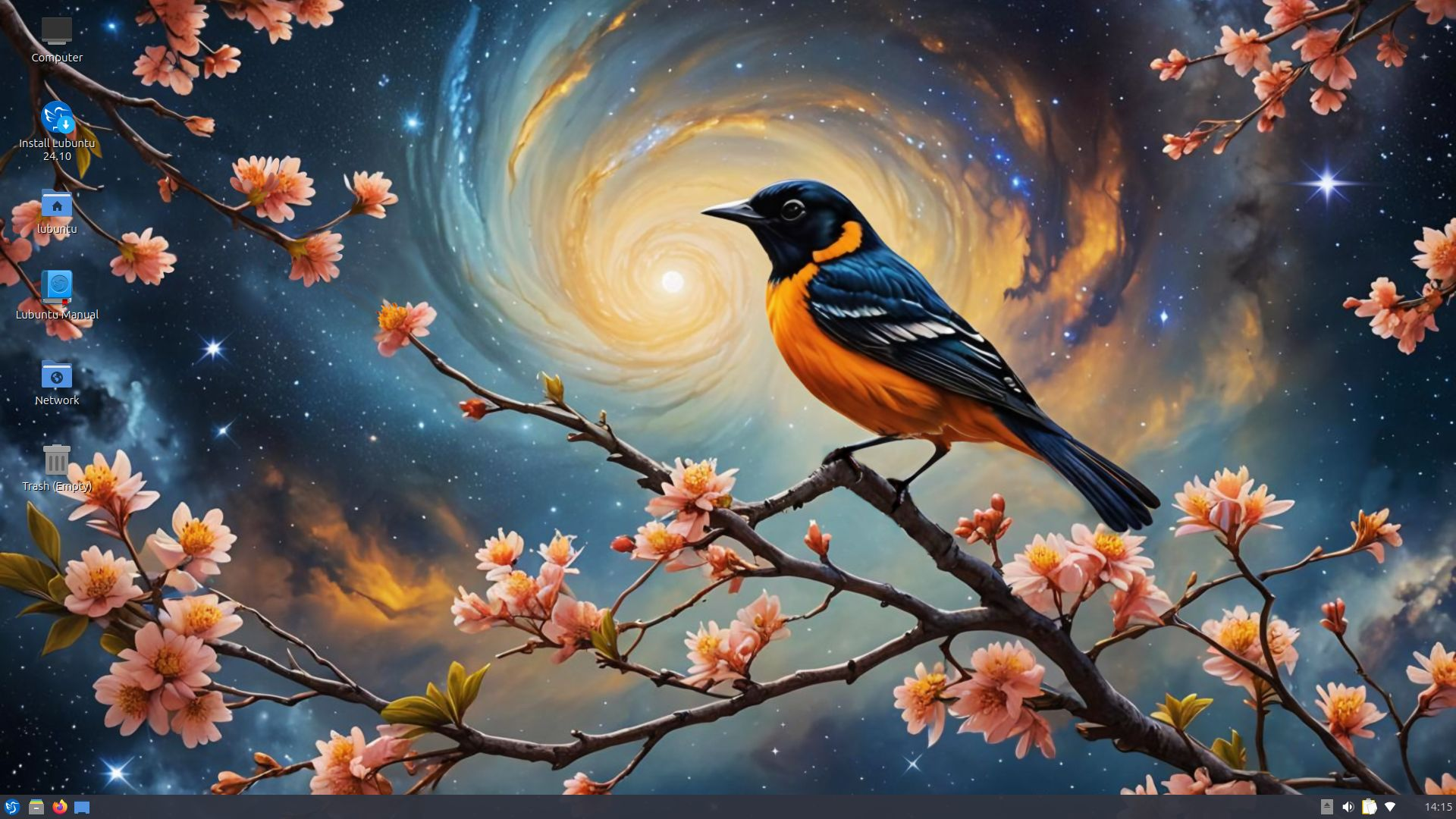
Lubuntu 24.10

Lubuntu 24.10 is an interim release, released on 10 October 2024. Support provided until July 2025.

=== Lubuntu 25.04 ===
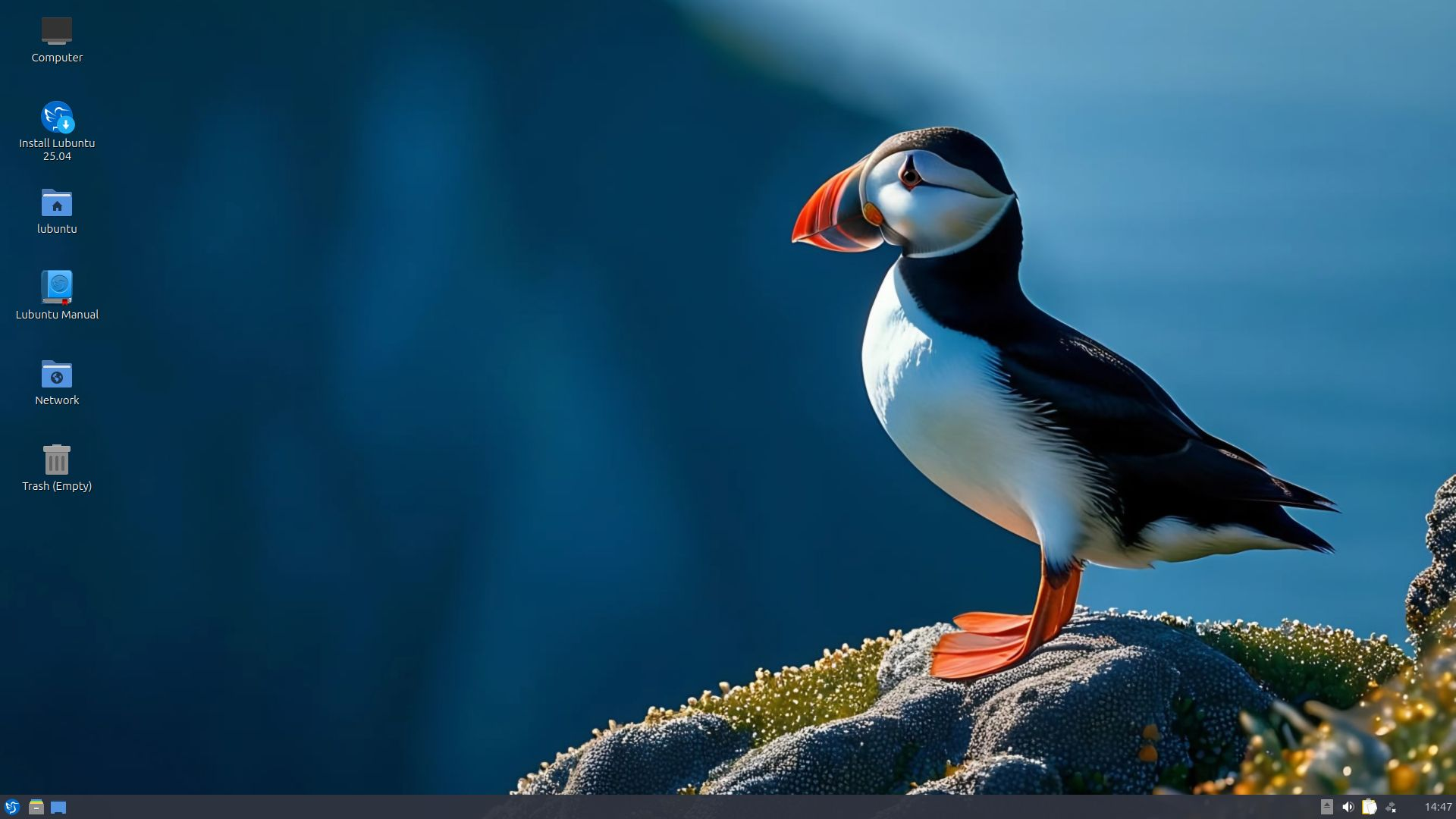
Lubuntu 25.04

Lubuntu 25.04 is an interim release, released on 17 April 2025. Support provided until January 2026.

=== Lubuntu 25.10 ===
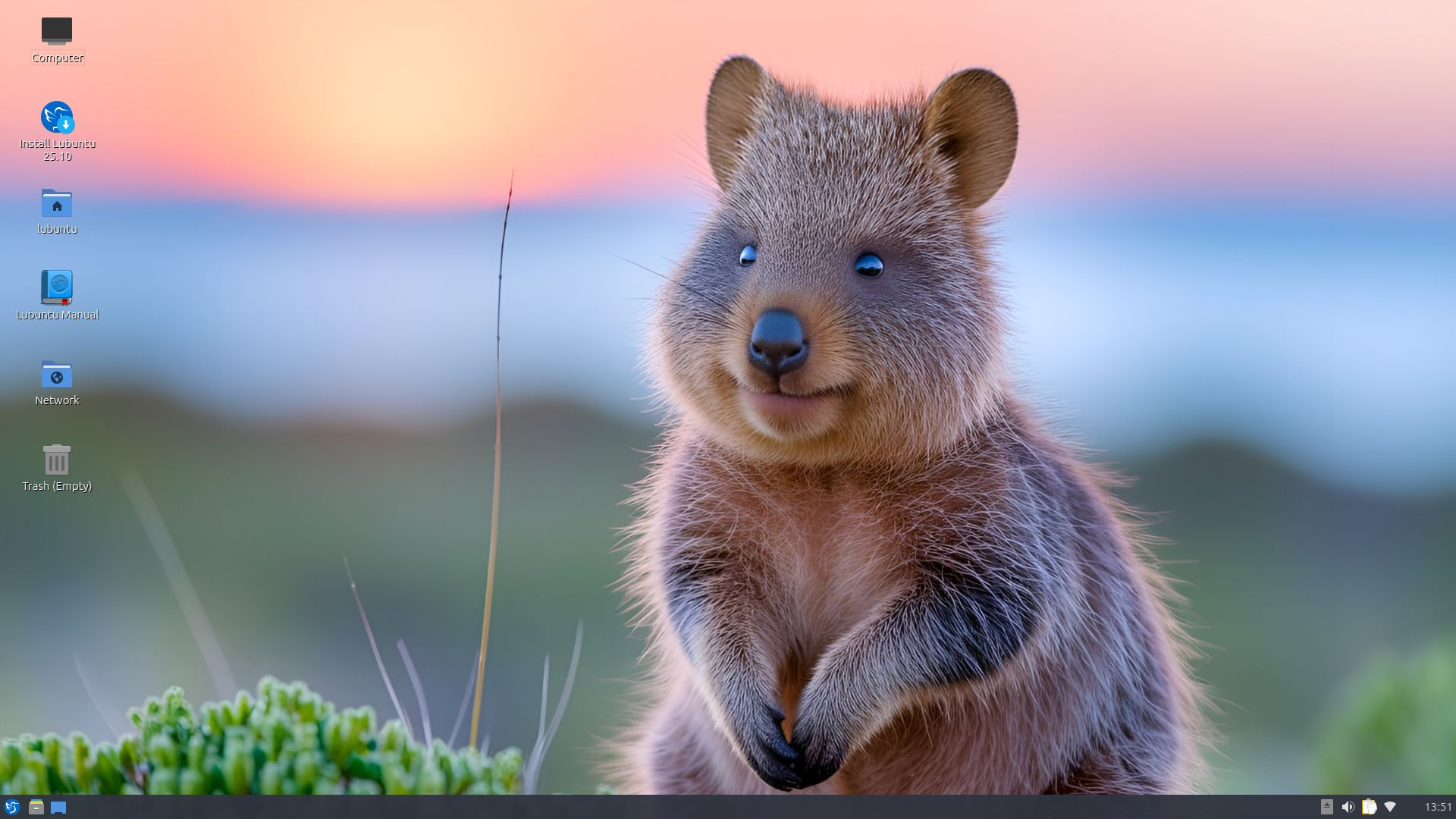
Lubuntu 25.10

Lubuntu 25.10 is an interim release, released on 9 October 2025. Support provided until July 2026.

=== Lubuntu 26.04 LTS ===
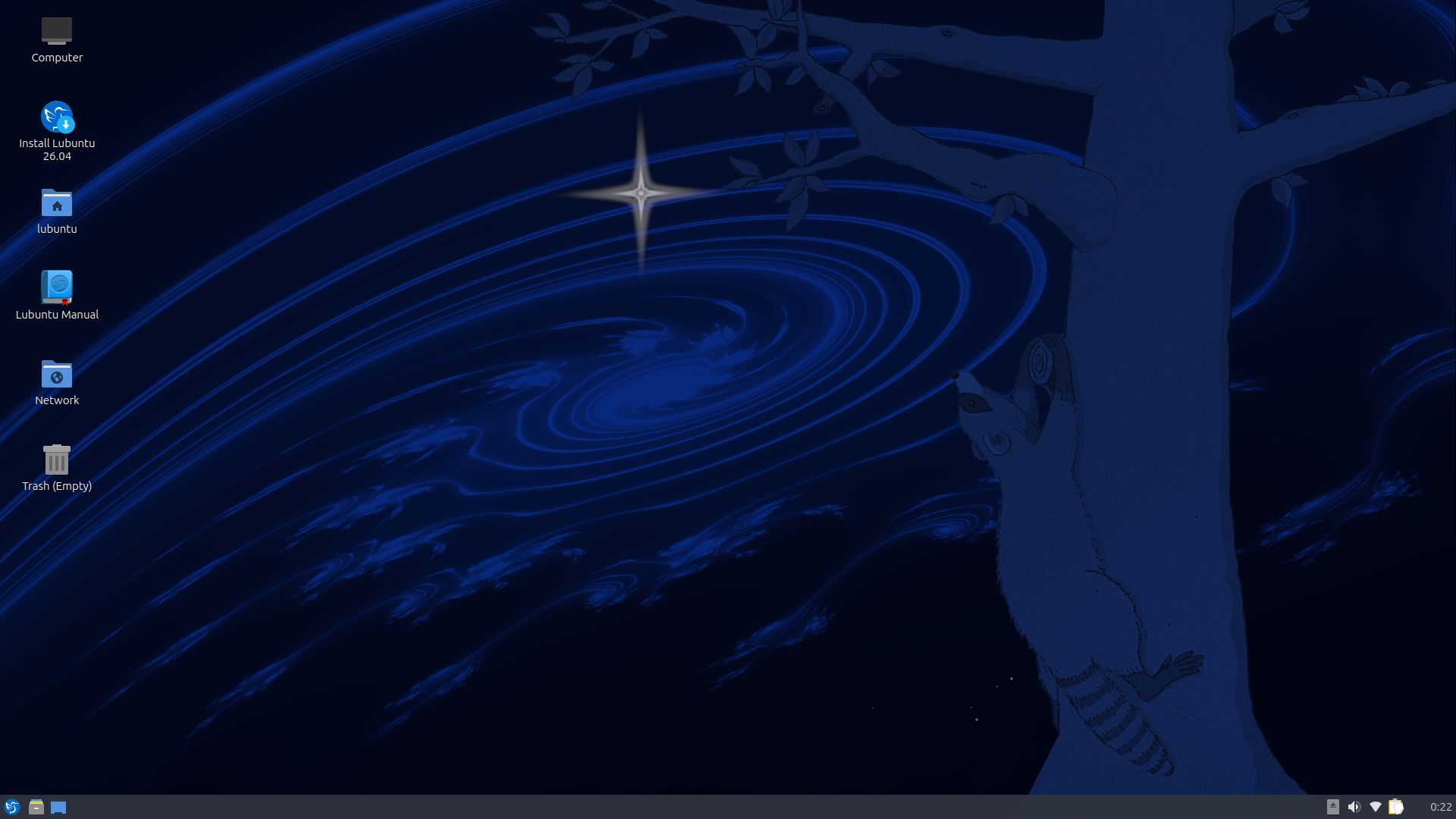
Lubuntu 26.04 LTS

Lubuntu 26.04 LTS (codenamed "Resolute Raccoon") is a Long Term Support version and was released on 23 April 2026. Like other LTS releases it will receive 3 years of official support from the Lubuntu team until April 2029.

It features LXQt 2.3, continuing the transition to Wayland, although Wayland is not included.

== Applications ==
=== Lubuntu LXQt ===
The LXQt versions of Lubuntu (18.10 and later) include the following applications:

Internet Applications

- Firefox – web browser
- Qtransmission – bit torrent client
- Quassel – internet relay chat
- Bluedevil – bluetooth connector
- Trojitá – email client (removed in Lubuntu 22.04 LTS)

Office Applications

- LibreOffice – office suite
  - LibreOffice Calc – spread sheet
  - LibreOffice Impress – presentation
  - LibreOffice Math – math formula writer
  - LibreOffice Writer – word processor
- qpdfview – PDF viewer

Graphics Applications

- ImageMagick – image manipulation
- lximage – image viewer
- ScreenGrab – screenshot tool
- Skanlite – scanning application

Accessories

- 2048-qt – a lightweight implementation of the 2048 video game
- LXQt Archiver – archive utility
- Discover Software Center
- FeatherPad – lightweight text editor
- Kcalc – scientific calculator
- KDE partition manager
- Muon package manager
- Noblenote – note taking application
- PCManFM-Qt – file manager
- Qlipper – clipboard manager

Sound and Video

- K3b – CD and DVD burning (removed in Lubuntu 22.04 LTS)
- PulseAudio Volume Control
- VLC media player

From 18.10, Lubuntu also has access to the Ubuntu software repositories through the Discover Software Center, the Synaptic package manager and APT allowing the installation of any applications available to Ubuntu.

=== Lubuntu LXDE ===
The LXDE versions of Lubuntu (18.04 LTS and earlier) included the following applications:

User applications:

- Abiword – word processor
- Audacious – music player
- Evince – PDF reader
- File-roller – archiver
- Firefox – web browser
- Galculator – calculator
- GDebi – package installer
- GNOME Software – package manager
- Gnumeric – spreadsheet
- Guvcview – webcam
- LightDM – log-in manager
- Light-Locker – screen locker
- MPlayer – video player
- mtPaint – graphics painting
- Pidgin – instant messenger and microblogging
- scrot – screenshot tool
- Simple Scan – scanning
- Sylpheed – email client
- Synaptic and Lubuntu Software Center – package managers
- Transmission – bittorrent client
- Update Manager
- Startup Disk Creator – USB ISO writer
- Wget – command line webpage downloader
- XChat – IRC
- Xfburn – CD burner
- Xpad – notetaking

From LXDE:

- GPicView – image viewer
- Leafpad – text editor
- LXAppearance
- LXDE Common
- LXDM
- LXLauncher
- LXPanel
- LXRandr
- LXSession
- LXSession Edit
- LXShortCut
- LXTask
- LXTerminal
- Menu-Cache
- Openbox – window manager
- PCManFM – file manager

Up to and including 18.04 LTS, Lubuntu also had access to the Ubuntu software repositories through the Lubuntu Software Center, the Synaptic package manager and APT allowing the installation of any applications available to Ubuntu.

== Table of releases ==
Version	Code name	Release date	Supported until	Remarks
8.10	Intrepid Ibex	2008-10-30	April 2010	Available as an optional desktop package only
9.04	Jaunty Jackalope	2009-04-23	October 2010	Available as an optional desktop package only
9.10	Karmic Koala	2009-10-26	April 2011	Available as an optional desktop package only
10.04	Lucid Lynx	2010-05-02	April 2013	First stand-alone version, supported as if it were an LTS to provide longer term support for old CPUs
10.10	Maverick Meerkat	2010-10-10	April 2012	Considered to be a "stable beta"
11.04	Natty Narwhal	2011-04-28	October 2012	
11.10	Oneiric Ocelot	2011-10-13	April 2013	First version with an official x86-64 live CD. First version with official sanction as a member of the Ubuntu family.
12.04	Precise Pangolin	2012-04-26	October 2013	Ubuntu 12.04 is a Long Term Support (LTS) release, but Lubuntu 12.04 is not.
12.10	Quantal Quetzal	2012-10-18	April 2014	Includes new Box Icon Theme
13.04	Raring Ringtail	2013-04-25	December 2013	
13.10	Saucy Salamander	2013-10-17	2014-07-17	Chromium replaced with Firefox
14.04 LTS	Trusty Tahr	2014-04-17	April 2017	First Lubuntu Long Term Support (LTS) release, supported for 3 years
14.10	Utopic Unicorn	2014-10-24	June 2015	
15.04	Vivid Vervet	2015-04-23	December 2015	
15.10	Wily Werewolf	2015-10-22	28 July 2016	
16.04 LTS	Xenial Xerus	2016-04-21	April 2019	Second Lubuntu Long Term Support (LTS) release, supported for 3 years
16.10	Yakkety Yak	2016-10-13	July 2017	
17.04	Zesty Zapus	2017-04-13	2018-01-13	
17.10	Artful Aardvark	2017-10-19	July 2018	
18.04 LTS	Bionic Beaver	2018-04-26	2021-04-30	Third Lubuntu Long Term Support release, supported for 3 years
18.10	Cosmic Cuttlefish	2018-10-18	2019-07-18	First release with the LXQt desktop
19.04	Disco Dingo	2019-04-18	2020-01-23	
19.10	Eoan Ermine	2019-10-17	2020-07-17	
20.04 LTS	Focal Fossa	2020-04-23	2023-04-28	Fourth Lubuntu Long Term Support (LTS) release, supported for 3 years
20.10	Groovy Gorilla	2020-10-22	2021-07-22	
21.04	Hirsute Hippo	2021-04-22	2022-01-20	
21.10	Impish Indri	2021-10-14	2022-07-14	
22.04 LTS	Jammy Jellyfish	2022-04-21	April 2025	
22.10	Kinetic Kudu	2022-10-20	July 2023	
23.04	Lunar Lobster	2023-04-20	2024-01-25	
23.10	Mantic Minotaur	2023-10-12	July 2024	
24.04 LTS	Noble Numbat	2024-04-25	April 2027	Fifth LTS release, supported for 3 years
24.10	Oracular Oriole	2024-10-10	July 2025	
25.04	Plucky Puffin	2025-04-17	January 2026	
25.10	Questing Quokka	2025-10-9	2026-07-09	
26.04 LTS	Resolute Raccoon	2026-04-23	April 2029	Current LTS version, supported for 3 years
26.10	Stonking Stingray	2026-10-15	July 2027	Current interim release
Legend: Old version, not maintained Older version, still maintained Current stable version Future version

== See also ==
Similar Linux distributions

- Manjaro Linux – a similar project based on Arch Linux with various desktops to choose from, including LXDE.
- Peppermint Linux OS – based on Lubuntu with Linux Mint's utilities.

Other links

- Computer technology for developing areas
- Free-culture movement
- Linux user group
- List of Ubuntu-based distributions
- Open-source software
