= Runlevel =

Mode of operation in computer operating systems

A runlevel is a mode of operation in the computer operating systems that implements Unix System V-style initialization. Conventionally, seven runlevels exist, numbered from zero to six. S is sometimes used as a synonym for one of the levels. Only one runlevel is executed on startup; run levels are not executed one after another (i.e. only runlevel 2, 3, or 4 is executed, not more of them sequentially or in any other order).

A runlevel defines the state of the machine after boot. Different runlevels are typically assigned (not necessarily in any particular order) to the single-user mode, multi-user mode without network services started, multi-user mode with network services started, system shutdown, and system reboot system states. The exact setup of these configurations varies between operating systems and Linux distributions. For example, runlevel 4 might be a multi-user GUI no-server configuration on one distribution, and nothing on another. Runlevels commonly follow the general patterns described in this article; however, some distributions employ certain specific configurations.

In standard practice, when a computer enters runlevel zero, it shuts off, and when it enters runlevel six, it reboots. The intermediate runlevels (1–5) differ in terms of which drives are mounted and which network services are started. Default runlevels are typically 3, 4, or 5. Lower runlevels are useful for maintenance or emergency repairs, since they usually offer no network services at all. The particular details of runlevel configuration differ widely among operating systems, and also among system administrators.

In various Linux distributions, the traditional /etc/rc script used in the Version 7 Unix was first replaced by runlevels and then by systemd states on most major distributions.

== Standard runlevels ==
Standard runlevels
ID	Name	Description
0	Off	Turns off the device.
1	Single user mode	Does not configure network interfaces or start daemons. (Note: Almost all systems use runlevel 1 for this purpose. This mode is intended to provide a safe environment to perform system maintenance. Originally this runlevel provided a single terminal (console) interface running a root login shell. The increasing trend towards physical access to the computer during the boot process has led to changes in this area.)
6	Reboot	Reboots the device.

== Linux ==
After the Linux kernel has booted, the /sbin/init program reads the /etc/inittab file to determine the behavior for each runlevel. Unless the user specifies another value as a kernel boot parameter, the system will attempt to enter (start) the default runlevel.

Although systemd is, as of 2016, used by default in most major Linux distributions, runlevels can still be used through the means provided by the sysvinit project. Systemd also provides a compatibility layer to map runlevels to its targets.

=== Linux Standard Base specification ===
Systems conforming to the Linux Standard Base (LSB) need not provide the exact run levels given here or give them the meanings described here, and may map any level described here to a different level which provides the equivalent functionality.

LSB 4.1.0
ID	Name	Description
0	Off	Turns off the device.
1	Single-user mode	Mode for administrative tasks. (Note: The additional behavior of runlevel 1 varies greatly. All distributions provide at least one virtual terminal. Some distributions start a login shell as the superuser; some require correctly entering the superuser's password; others provide a login prompt, allowing access to any registered user.)
2	Multi-user mode	Does not configure network interfaces and does not export networks services. (Note: In some cases, runlevels 2 and 3 function identically, offering a multi-user mode with networking.)
3	Multi-user mode with networking	Starts the system normally.
4	Not used/user-definable	For special purposes.
5	Full mode	Same as runlevel 3 + display manager.
6	Reboot	Reboots the device.

=== Slackware Linux ===
Slackware Linux uses runlevel 1 for maintenance, as on other Linux distributions; runlevels 2, 3 and 5 identically configured for a console (with all services active); and runlevel 4 adds the X Window System.

Slackware Linux runlevels
ID	Description
0	Off
1	Single-user mode
2	Unused but configured the same as runlevel 3
3	Multi-user mode without display manager
4	Multi-user mode with display manager (X11 or a session manager)
5	Full mode
6	Reboot

=== Gentoo Linux ===
Gentoo Linux runlevels
ID	Description
0	Off
1 or S	Single-user mode
2	Multi-user mode without networking.
3	Multi-user mode
4	Aliased for runlevel 3
5	Full mode
6	Reboot

=== Debian Linux ===
Debian Linux runlevels
ID	Description
0	Off
1	Recovery mode
2,3,4	Partial mode
5	Full mode
6	Reboot

== Unix ==
=== System V Releases 3 and 4 ===
System V runlevels
ID	Description
0	Off
1	Single-user mode, all filesystems unmounted but not root, all processes except console processes killed
2	Multi-user mode
3	Multi-user mode with RFS (and NFS in Release 4) filesystems exported
4	Multi-user, User-definable
5	Go to firmware
6	Reboot
s, S	Identical to 1, except current terminal acts as the system console

=== Solaris ===
Starting from Solaris 10, SMF (Service Management Facility) is used instead of SVR4 run levels. The latter are emulated to preserve compatibility with legacy startup scripts.

Solaris runlevels
ID	Description
0	On SPARC systems, it returns to firmware, while on x86 systems, it shuts off the machine. If the user presses Enter, the system reboots.
S	Single-user mode with only root filesystem mounted (as read-only) -- Solaris 10+: svc:/milestone/single-user
1	Single-user mode with all local filesystems mounted (read-write)
2	Multi-user mode with most daemons started – Solaris 10+: svc:/milestone/multi-user
3	Multi-user mode; identical to 2 (runlevel 3 runs both /sbin/rc2 and /sbin/rc3), with filesystems exported, plus some other network services started. -- Solaris 10+: svc:/milestone/multi-user-server
4	Alternative Multi-user mode, User-definable
5	Off
6	Reboot

=== HP-UX ===
HP-UX runlevels
ID	Description
0	Off
S	Single-user mode, booted to system console only, with only root filesystem mounted (as read-only)
s	Single-user mode, identical to S except the current terminal acts as the system console
1	Single-user mode with local filesystems mounted (read-write)
2	Multi-user mode with most daemons started and Common Desktop Environment launched
3	Identical to runlevel 2 with NFS exported
4	Multi-user mode with VUE started instead of CDE
5, 6	Not used/User-definable

=== AIX ===
AIX does not follow the System V R4 (SVR4) runlevel specification, with runlevels from 0 to 9 available, as well as from a to c (or h). 0 and 1 are reserved, 2 is the default normal multi-user mode and runlevels from 3 to 9 are free to be defined by the administrator. Runlevels from a to c (or h) allow the execution of processes in that runlevel without killing processes started in another.

AIX runlevels
ID	Name	Description
0		reserved
1		reserved
2	Normal Multi-user mode	default mode

The S, s, M and m runlevels are not true runlevels, but are used to tell the init command to enter maintenance mode. When the system enters maintenance mode from another runlevel, only the system console is used as the terminal.

== See also ==
- Init
- Operating system service management
- systemd
- Upstart
