= Init =

UNIX system component

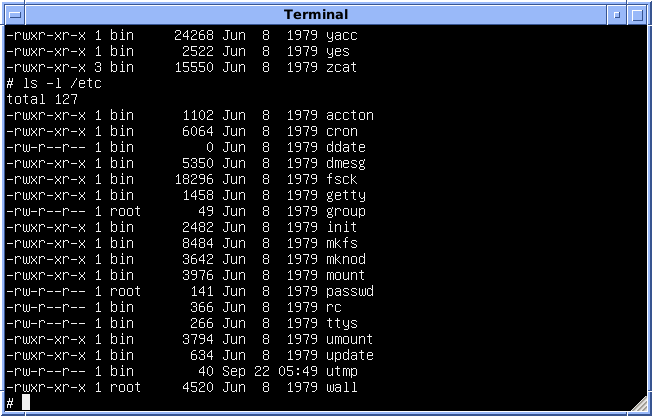
Version 7 Unix: /etc listing, showing init and rc

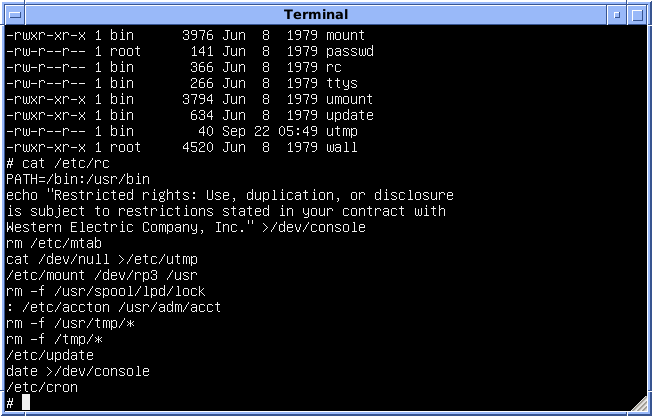
Version 7 Unix: contents of an /etc/rc Bourne shell script

In Unix-like computer operating systems, init (short for initialization) is the first user-space process started during booting of the operating system. Init is a daemon process that continues running until the system is shut down. It is the direct or indirect ancestor of all other processes and automatically adopts all orphaned processes. Init is started by the kernel during the booting process; in most Unix-like systems, a kernel panic will occur if the kernel is unable to start it or if it dies for any reason. Init is typically assigned process identifier 1.

In Unix systems such as System III and System V, the design of init diverged from the functionality provided by the init in Research Unix and its BSD derivatives. Up until the early 2010s, most Linux distributions employed a traditional init that was somewhat compatible with System V, while some distributions such as Slackware use BSD-style startup scripts, and other distributions such as Gentoo have their own customized versions.

Since then, most Linux distributions have employed a more modern init system, with most employing the init provided by the systemd project. Some distributions have elected to create their own System V-init compatible system, such as Gentoo Linux's OpenRC and Void Linux's runit. These projects typically include features originally not in System V's init, such as multi-threading or interactive init. Most modern init systems are also able to dynamically start, stop and enable services after boot with prompting by the user.

== Research Unix-style/BSD-style ==
Research Unix init runs the initialization shell script located at /etc/rc, then launches getty on terminals under the control of /etc/ttys. There are no runlevels; the /etc/rc file determines what programs are run by init. The advantage of this system is that it is simple and easy to edit manually. However, new software added to the system may require changes to existing files that risk producing an unbootable system.

BSD init was, prior to 4.3BSD, the same as Research UNIX's init; in 4.3BSD, it added support for running a windowing system such as X on graphical terminals under the control of /etc/ttys. To remove the requirement to edit /etc/rc, BSD variants have long supported a site-specific /etc/rc.local file that is run in a sub-shell near the end of the boot sequence.

A fully modular system was introduced with NetBSD 1.5 and ported to FreeBSD 5.0, OpenBSD 4.9 and successors. This system executes scripts in the /etc/rc.d directory. Unlike System V's script ordering, which is derived from the filename of each script, this system uses explicit dependency tags placed within each script. The order in which scripts are executed is determined by the rcorder utility based on the requirements stated in these tags.

== SysV-style ==
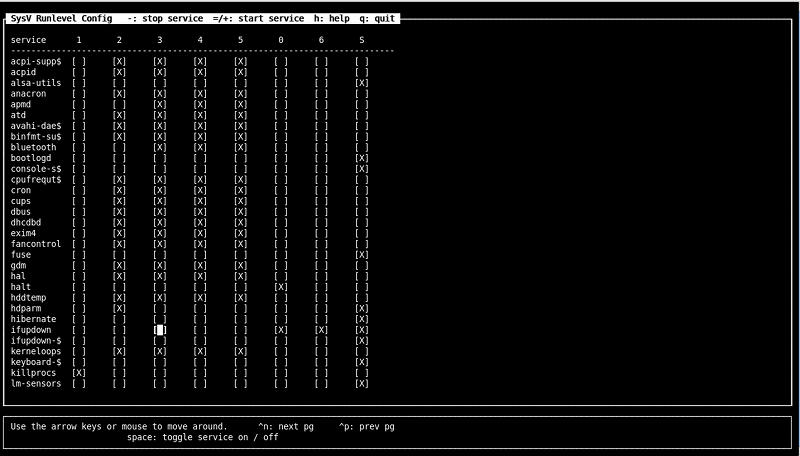
sysv-rc-conf, a TUI utility that selects which SysV-style init scripts will be run in each runlevel

When compared to its predecessors, AT&T's UNIX System III introduced a new style of system startup configuration, which survived (with modifications) into UNIX System V and is therefore called the "SysV-style init".

At any moment, a running System V is in one of the predetermined number of states, called runlevels. At least one runlevel is the normal operating state of the system; typically, other runlevels represent single-user mode (used for repairing a faulty system), system shutdown, and various other states. Switching from one runlevel to another causes a per-runlevel set of scripts to be run, which typically mount filesystems, start or stop daemons, start or stop the X Window System, shutdown the machine, etc.

=== Runlevels ===
The runlevels in System V describe certain states of a machine, characterized by the processes and daemons running in each of them. In general, there are seven runlevels, out of which three runlevels are considered "standard", as they are essential to the operation of a system:

0. Turn off
1. Single-user mode (also known as S or s)
6. Reboot

Aside from these standard ones, Unix and Unix-like systems treat runlevels somewhat differently. The common denominator, the /etc/inittab file, defines what each configured runlevel does in a given system.

=== Default runlevels ===
Operating system	Default runlevel
AIX	2
antiX	5
Gentoo Linux	3
HP-UX	3 (console/server/multiuser) or 4 (graphical)
Slackware Linux	3
Solaris / illumos	3
UNIX System V Releases 3.x, 4.x	2
UnixWare 7.x	3

On Linux distributions defaulting to runlevel 5 in the table on the right, runlevel 5 invokes a multiuser graphical environment running the X Window System, usually with a display manager like GDM or KDM. However, the Solaris and illumos operating systems typically reserve runlevel 5 to shut down and automatically power off the machine.

On most systems, all users can check the current runlevel with either the runlevel or who -r command. The root user typically changes the current runlevel by running the telinit or init commands. The /etc/inittab file sets the default runlevel with the :initdefault: entry.

On Unix systems, changing the runlevel is achieved by starting only the missing services (as each level defines only those that are started / stopped). For example, changing a system from runlevel 3 to 4 might only start the local X server. Going back to runlevel 3, it would be stopped again.

== Other implementations ==
Traditionally, one of the major drawbacks of init is that it starts tasks serially, waiting for each to finish loading before moving on to the next. When startup processes end up Input/output (I/O) blocked, this can result in long delays during boot. Speeding up I/O, e.g. by using SSDs, may shorten the delays but it does not address the root cause.

Various efforts have been made to replace the traditional init daemons to address this and other design problems, including:

=== General ===
Name	Developer	Latest release		License	Notes
Name	Developer	Version	Date	License	Notes
BootScripts	GoboLinux Scripts Contributors	016.02	August 16, 2017; 9 years ago	GPL	(Note: BootScripts in GoboLinux)
busybox-init	Bruce Perens etc.	1.36.1	19 May 2023; 3 years ago	GPL-2.0-only Since 1.3.0; GPL-2.0-or-later Until 1.2.2.1	(Note: busybox-init, suited to embedded operating systems, used by Alpine Linux (before being replaced with OpenRC), SliTaz 5 (Rolling), Tiny Core Linux, and VMware ESXi, and used by OpenWrt before it was replaced with procd)
dinit	Davin McCall	0.22.1	4 July 2026; 2 months ago	AL2	(Note: dinit, a service manager and init system.)
Epoch	Epoch Contributors	1.3.0	June 24, 2015; 11 years ago	Unlicense	(Note: Epoch, a single-threaded Linux init system focused on simplicity and service management)
finit	Joachim Wiberg, etc.	4.17	April 28, 2026; 4 months ago	MIT	
ginitd	S. M. Wood-Mattheusson				(Note: ginitd, a software package that consists of an init system and a service management system)
Initng	Initng Contributors	0.6.10.2	March 25, 2007; 19 years ago	GPL-3.0	(Note: Initng, a full replacement of init designed to start processes asynchronously)
launchd	Apple Inc.	10.4	April 29, 2005; 21 years ago	Proprietary (was APSL then AL2)	(Note: launchd, a replacement for init in Darwin and Darwin-based operating systems such as macOS and iOS starting with Mac OS X v10.4 (it launches SystemStarter to run old-style 'rc.local' and SystemStarter processes))
OpenRC	Roy Marples etc.	0.63.3	2 July 2026; 2 months ago	BSD-2-Clause	(Note: OpenRC, a process spawner that utilizes system-provided init, while providing process isolation, parallelized startup, and service dependency; used by Alpine Linux, Gentoo and its derivatives, and available as an option in Devuan and Artix Linux.)
procd	Daniel Golle, etc.		June 17, 2026; 2 months ago	GPL-2.0-only	
runit	Gerrit Pape etc.	2.3.1	7 February 2026; 7 months ago	BSD-3-Clause	(Note: runit, a cross-platform full replacement for init with parallel starting of services, used by default in Void Linux)
s6	Laurent Bercot	2.15.1.0	14 July 2026; 58 days ago	ISC	(Note: s6, a software suite that includes an init system)
Service Management Facility (SMF)	Sun Microsystems	5.10	January 31, 2005; 21 years ago	CDDL	(Note: Service Management Facility (SMF), a complete replacement/redesign of init from the ground up in illumos/Solaris starting with Solaris 10, but launched as the only service by the original System V-style init)
Shepherd	Ludovic Courtès etc.	1.0.9	3 December 2025; 9 months ago	GPL-3.0-or-later	(Note: Shepherd, the GNU service and daemon manager which provides asynchronous, dependency-based initialisation; written in Guile Scheme and meant to be interactively hackable during normal system operation)
systemd	Red Hat345 in 20182,032 total	261.2	23 July 2026; 49 days ago	LGPL-2.1-or-later	(Note: systemd, a software suite, full replacement for init in Linux that includes an init daemon, with concurrent starting of services, service manager, and other features. Used by Debian (replaces SysV init) and Ubuntu, among other popular Linux distributions. As of February 2019, systemd has been adopted by most major Linux distributions.)
SystemStarter	Wilfredo Sanchez	10.4	April 29, 2005; 21 years ago	BSD	(Note: SystemStarter, a process spawner started by the BSD-style init in Mac OS X prior to Mac OS X v10.4)
Upstart	Canonical Ltd.	1.13.2	September 4, 2014; 12 years ago	GPL-2.0-only	(Note: Upstart, a full replacement of init designed to start processes asynchronously. Initiated by Ubuntu and used by them until 2014. It was also used in Fedora 9, Red Hat Enterprise Linux 6 and Google's ChromeOS.)
Name	Developer	Latest release		License	Notes
Name	Developer	Version	Date	License	Notes

=== Operating system support ===
Name	Linux	BSD	Darwin	Hurd	Solaris	Other
BootScripts	Yes	No	No	No	No	No
busybox-init	Yes	Yes	Yes	Yes	Yes	POSIX
dinit	Yes	Yes	Yes	Yes	Yes	POSIX
Epoch	Yes	No	No	No	No	No
finit	Yes	No	No	No	No	No
Initng	Yes	Yes	No	No	No	Haiku
launchd	No	No	Yes	No	No	No
OpenRC	Yes	Yes	No	No	No	No
procd	Yes	No	No	No	No	No
runit	Yes	Yes	Yes	Yes	Yes	POSIX
s6	Yes	Yes	Yes	Yes	Yes	POSIX
Service Management Facility (SMF)	No	No	No	No	Yes	No
Shepherd	Yes	No	No	Yes	No	No
systemd	Yes	No	No	No	No	No
SystemStarter	No	No	Yes	No	No	No
Upstart	Yes	No	No	No	No	No
Name	Linux	BSD	Darwin	Hurd	Solaris	Other

=== Compatibility, interface and programming ===
Comparison of init systems
Name	musl libc compatible	dependency free	script/ service format	Plain log format	Per- service config	Cross- service events	Parallel service startup	Process supervision	Programming language	Codebase size (lines)
BootScripts	?	?	Shell scripts	?	?	?	?	?	Shell 66.6%; C 19.0%; Python 12.7%; Other 1.7%	?
busybox-init	?	?	?	?	?	?	?	?	C 90.4%; shell script 4.6%; C++ 1.7%; HTML 1.4%; Assembly 0.8%; Make 0.5%; XML 0.2%; Perl 0.3%; Python 0.1%	320,773
dinit	Yes	Yes	Text config	Yes	Yes	Yes	Yes	Native	C++ 96.1%; Starlark 1.0%; C 1.0%; Shell 0.9%; Makefile 0.7%; Zig 0.2%; Go 0.1%	~25,000
Epoch	Yes	libc, /bin/sh	multiple or single.conf	Yes	Yes (v1.1+)	(basic support, v1.3+)	No	Yes	C 98.2%; shell script 1.8%; Make 0.1%	10,546
finit	?	?	multiple or single.conf	Yes	?	?	Yes	Yes	C 86.7%; shell script 9.7%; Automake 1.8%; Autoconf 1.5%; Make 0.3%	33,146
Initng	?	?	?	?	?	?	?	?	C 67.5%; Assembly 12.8%; shell script 13.2%; Python 2.7%; CMake 1.5%; Jam 1.1%; HTML 0.6%; Make 0.5%; Vim Script 0.1%	59,471
launchd	?	Yes	plist	?	Yes	No	Yes	Yes	C 96.1%; shell script 2.2%; C++ 1.3%; Make 0.4%; XML 0.1%	28,128
OpenRC	Yes	init (sysv or BSD)	Shell scripts	Yes	Yes (conf.d)	Yes	Disabled by default	Via external tool	C 87.6%; shell script 12.2%; Perl 0.2%	23,818
procd	?	?	Shell scripts	?	Yes	?	?	Yes	C 98.8%; CMake 0.8%; shell script 0.4%	18,872
runit	Yes	Yes	Shell scripts	Yes	No	Yes	Via supervision trees	Native	C 57.4%; HTML 32.1%; shell script 6.3%; Make 4.0%; XML 0.2%	11,616
s6	Yes	execline	execline/ shell	Yes	No	Yes	Yes	Native	C 48.3%; HTML 46.1%; shell script 2.8%; Autoconf 2.0%; Make 0.7%; Emacs Lisp 0.1%	31,553
Service Management Facility (SMF)	?	init (sysv?)	XML (+ shell scripts)	Yes	Yes (service instances)	Yes	Yes	Yes	C	?
Shepherd	?	?	?	?	?	?	?	?	Scheme 70.5%; shell script 28.3%; Automake 0.7%; Autoconf 0.4%	6,606
systemd	Limited	dbus udev dns ntp GNOME NetworkManager PipeWire ...	Unit files	No (journald)	Yes	Yes	Yes	Built-in but opaque	C 77.9%; XML 12.5%; shell script 3.9%; Python 3.2%; C++ 2.4%; CSS 0.1%	1,390,713
Upstart	?	?	?	?	?	?	?	?	C 93.1%; Python 2.5%; Automake 1.1%; C++ 2.4%; shell script 0.3%; XML 0.3%; Autoconf 0.1%; Vim Script 0.1%	126,865
Name	musl libc compatible	dependency free	script/ service format	Plain log format	Per- service config	Cross- service events	Parallel service startup	Process supervision	Programming language	Codebase size (lines)

== See also ==
- Operating system service management
- Session Manager Subsystem — an equivalent in Windows NT
