= Scott James Remnant =

English software engineer (born 1980)

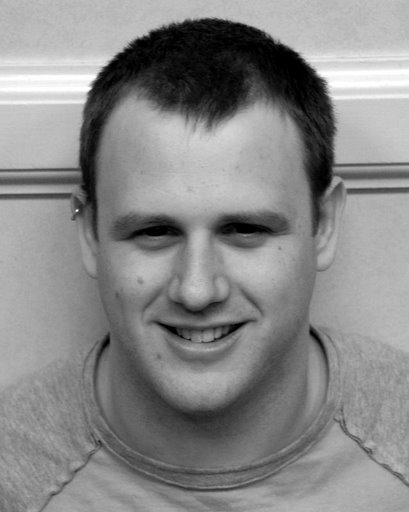
- Born: 18 July 1980 (age 46); Sussex, England
- Occupation: Software engineer
- Employer: Google
- Website: www.netsplit.com

Scott James Remnant (born 18 July 1980) is an open source software engineer. Scott served as a long-time Debian developer until 2006 and worked as "Ubuntu Developer Manager" on the Ubuntu Linux distribution at Canonical Ltd. He now works at Google as a Technical Lead on Bluetooth Systems.

== Work ==
- Scott had run the Linux humour website Segfault.org. Whilst being a Debian developer, Scott had maintained several important packages; notably being Libtool and Dpkg. Not only that but had the accomplishment of being the author of the Upstart initialization system. He had also developed the Planet weblog aggregation system. Furthermore, he served on the Ubuntu Technical Board until October 2011.

== Personal life ==
Scott is openly gay, and believes it important to be open about it to support others in the open source community.
