= SystemStarter =

Max OS X system program

SystemStarter is a system program in Mac OS X, started by Mac OS X's BSD-style init prior to Mac OS X v10.4 and by launchd in Mac OS X v10.4 and later releases, that starts system processes specified by a set of property lists. SystemStarter was originally written by Wilfredo Sanchez for Mac OS X. In Mac OS X v10.4, it was deprecated in favor of launchd, and kept in the system only to start system processes not yet converted to use launchd.

SystemStarter appears to have been removed from OS X 10.10 and later.
