= Single-user mode =

Computer operating mode, often used for repair or troubleshooting

Single-user mode is a mode in which a multiuser computer operating system boots into a single administrator user, instead of the normal system. It is mainly used for maintenance of multi-user environments, including network servers, where operating on the normal system would be difficult or impossible – for example, some tasks may require exclusive access to resources that are shared, like repairing a broken filesystem used for a network share. This mode can also be used for security purposes, as network services are not run, eliminating the possibility of outside interference. On some systems, a forgotten superuser password can be changed in single-user mode, although not asking for the password in this case is viewed as a security vulnerability.

== Unix family ==
Unix-like operating systems provide single-user mode functionality either through the System V-style runlevels, BSD-style boot-loader options, or other boot-time options.

Boot-loader options can be changed during startup before the execution of the kernel. GNU GRUB by default generates an additional recovery boot entry for this purpose to perform this function; manual editing of the kernel command-line is also available in the bootloader. The FreeBSD and DragonFly BSD bootloader offers the option on boot to start in single-user mode.

In systems using System V-style runlevels, the runlevel is usually changed using the init command. Selecting a runlevel of 1 (also s or S in some Unixes), will boot into single-user mode. The systemd equivalent is sudo systemctl isolate rescue.target.

Boot-loader options can also be changed at runtime, before rebooting the system.

- In FreeBSD and DragonFly BSD, it can be changed with the command nextboot -o "-s" -k kernel.
- In Solaris, the command reboot -- -s will cause a reboot into single-user mode.

=== masOS ===
In OS X El Capitan and later releases of macOS, a userspace reboot to single-user mode can be performed with the command sudo launchctl reboot userspace -s in Terminal, and the system can be fully rebooted in single-user mode with the command sudo launchctl reboot system -s.

On macOS High Sierra and earlier versions, a user can also enter single user mode by holding down ⌘ S at startup, which may require entering a password set in the firmware.

Single-user mode is different from safe mode in that the system goes directly to the console instead of starting up the core elements of macOS (items in /System/Library/, ignoring /Library/, ~/Library/, et al.). From there users are encouraged by a prompt to run fsck or other command line utilities as needed (or installed).

== Microsoft Windows ==
Microsoft Windows provides Recovery Console, Last Known Good Configuration, Safe Mode and recently the Windows Recovery Environment as standard recovery means. Bootable BartPE-based third-party recovery discs are available.

The Recovery Console and recovery discs are different from single-user modes in other operating systems because they are independent of the main operating system, whereas single-user mode is the same system operating in a different mode.
