= Service Management Facility =

Feature of the Solaris operating system

Service Management Facility (SMF) is a service-management framework in the Solaris operating system. It provides a consistent interface for configuring, starting, monitoring, and controlling system services, replacing much of the service-management role of the startup scripts and configuration files used in earlier versions of Solaris.

SMF represents services as first-class operating-system objects with defined states, dependencies, and instances. Dependencies determine startup and restart relationships and allow independent services to start in parallel, while failed services can in many cases be detected and restarted automatically. SMF also supports running services with limited privileges and delegating service-management tasks to non-root users. A service may have multiple instances, each representing a running execution of a defined service.

== What are services? ==
Services are software objects that provide a set of capabilities to other software. For example, a webserver provides HTTP service to web browsers. Other services include NFS for sharing files on a network, DHCP for dynamic IP address assignment, and Secure Shell for remote logins. Even higher level functions can be services, such as specific databases for e-commerce, finance, manufacturing control, etc. Typically, services are automatically started at boot up, long-lived, have common states (e.g. running, not running), relationship & dependencies (Sendmail service depends on Naming service, which depends on Networking services), and are critical to the dedicated function of the server.

== What it replaces ==
In versions of Solaris prior to Solaris 10, and in UNIX in general, services are configured in text files, with startup files in the /etc/rc.d/ directory trees, and configuration data in files such as /etc/inittab and /etc/inetd.conf. A typical system could have dozens of configuration files, and configuration could involve various methods, including editing shell scripts. With SMF, there is one consistent interface to ease administration.

Traditional `init.d`/`rc` service-management systems do not formally represent service dependencies or service boundaries and do not provide a general mechanism for automatically detecting and restarting failed services. SMF instead treats a service as a first-class operating-system entity that can be described, observed, and managed through a common service model, while retaining compatibility with legacy `init.d` services.

== SMF concepts ==
Instances: a service is a collection of configurations. An instance is a running execution of a defined service executable. One can have many instances of a defined service, such as multiple webservers listening on different ports referencing different WWW root directories.

Services can declare dependencies on other services. These dependencies determine both startup order and restart relationships. Because a service can be started as soon as its dependencies are satisfied, independent services can be started in parallel.

SMF uses restarters to manage the starting, stopping, monitoring, and restarting of services. A restarter is itself a process or service responsible for monitoring and restarting other services. SMF can automatically restart services following many hardware, software, or administrative failures and uses dependency information to identify affected services and assist in diagnosing the underlying failure. Services can also be configured to run as non-root users or with limited privileges, while service-management privileges can be delegated to authorised users without granting them full root access.

== See also ==
- Runlevel
- Process supervision
- Operating system service management
- systemd
