= Initng =

Process initialization in Unix-like computer systems

- Original author: Jimmy Wennlund
- Developer: Initng contributors
- Release: March 16, 2005; 21 years ago
- Stable release: 2.6.10 / March 24, 2007; 19 years ago
- Written in: C
- Operating system: Unix-like
- Platform: Cross-platform
- Available in: English
- Type: init
- License: GNU General Public License
- Website: Archived 2016-04-04 at the Wayback Machine
- Repository: sourceforge.net/projects/initng/files/

Initng is a full replacement of the UNIX System V init, the first process spawned by the kernel in Unix-like computer operating systems, which is responsible for the initialization of every other process. Initng's website calls initng "The next generation init system".

== Purpose ==
Many implementations of init (including Sysvinit used in many Linux distributions) start processes in a pre-determined order, and only start a process once the previous process finishes its initialization.

Initng starts a process as soon as all of its dependencies are met. It can start several processes in parallel. Initng is designed to significantly increase the speed of booting a Unix-compatible system by starting processes asynchronously. Initng's supporters claim that it also gives the user more statistics and control over the system.

== Development ==
Despite being still considered beta, it was chosen as the default init system for Pingwinek, Enlisy, Berry Linux and Bee.

Also there are packages for many distributions such as Ubuntu and Fedora, as well as ebuilds for Gentoo and spells for Source Mage.

Contrary to other similar projects, it features a portable and flexible code base, more suited for embedded usage, and has been already ported to other operating systems like Haiku and FreeBSD.

It was created by Jimmy Wennlund. The current maintainer and project lead is Ismael Luceno.

== Awards ==
In Linux Format's Issue 72, in November 2005, InitNG received the Hottest Pick Award.
