= Artix Linux =

Linux distribution

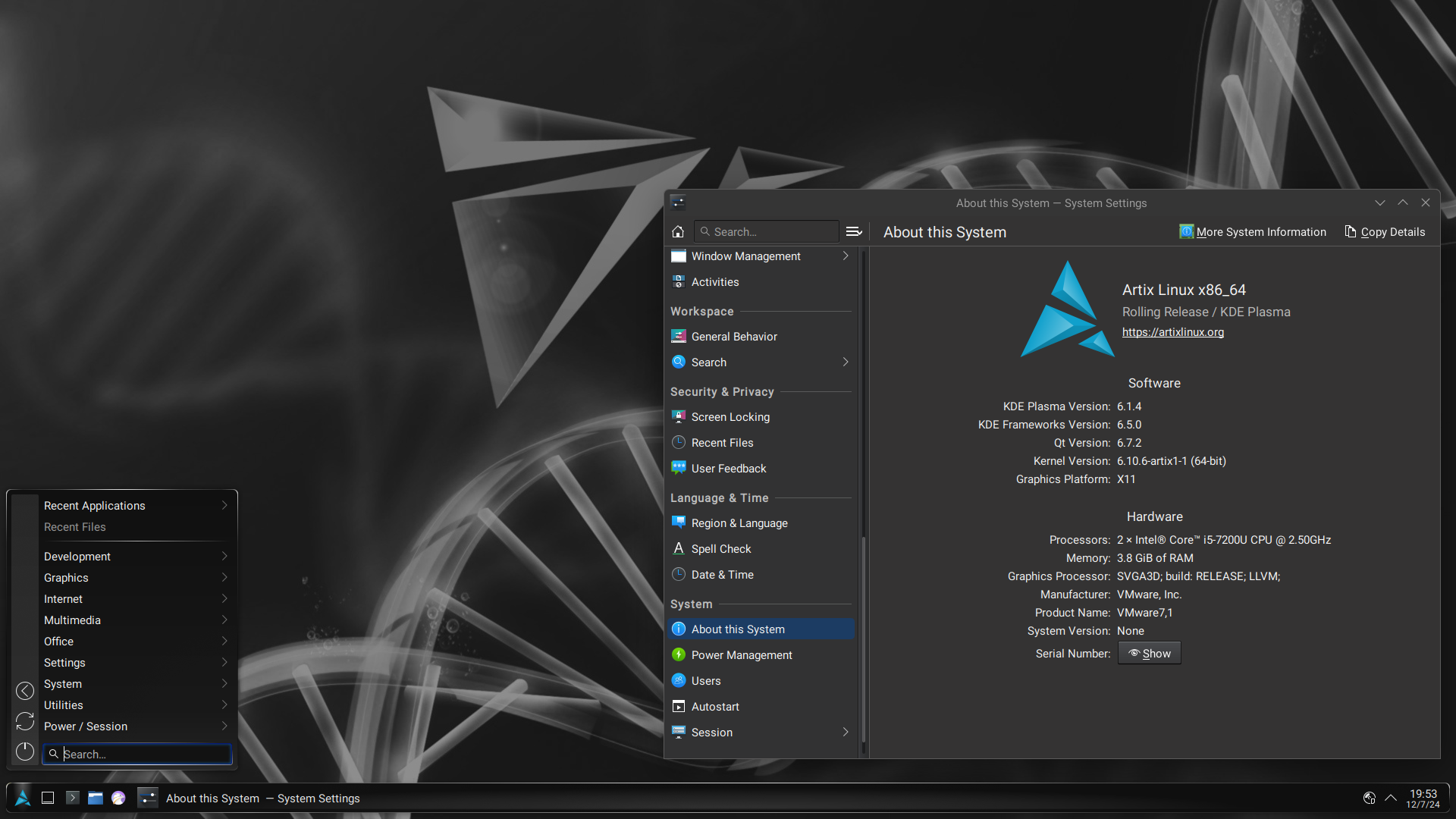
- Developer: Core team, Developer team, Support staff
- Written in: C
- OS family: Linux (Unix-like)
- Working state: Current
- Source model: Open-source
- Latest release: 20261102 / November 2, 2026; 6 days ago (Note: Artix Linux releases stable and weekly ISOs; stable images are tested to ensure Artix will boot and install the intended way and are released bi-annually. However, it is recommended to try the weekly ISOs first and only fallback to the stable ones in case of issues.)
- Latest preview: Weekly ISOs
- Repository: gitea.artixlinux.org
- Package manager: pacman
- Supported platforms: AMD64 and ARM64
- Kernel type: Monolithic (Linux)
- Userland: GNU
- Default user interface: Unix shell, LXQt, LXDE, MATE, Cinnamon, Plasma, XFCE
- Official website: artixlinux.org

Artix Linux (or simply Artix /ɑːrtɪks/) is a rolling-release Linux distribution based on Arch Linux that avoids using systemd, instead allowing users to choose between OpenRC, runit, s6, and dinit.

Artix Linux has its own repositories, and it is not recommended by developers to use Arch packages due to differences such as naming conventions and contrasting init systems.

The AUR, a user created repository of Arch programs, is commonly used by Artix users and developers, although not officially supported. This greatly expands the available software for Artix.

Arch OpenRC and Manjaro OpenRC were started in 2012. In 2017, these projects were merged and Artix Linux was created.

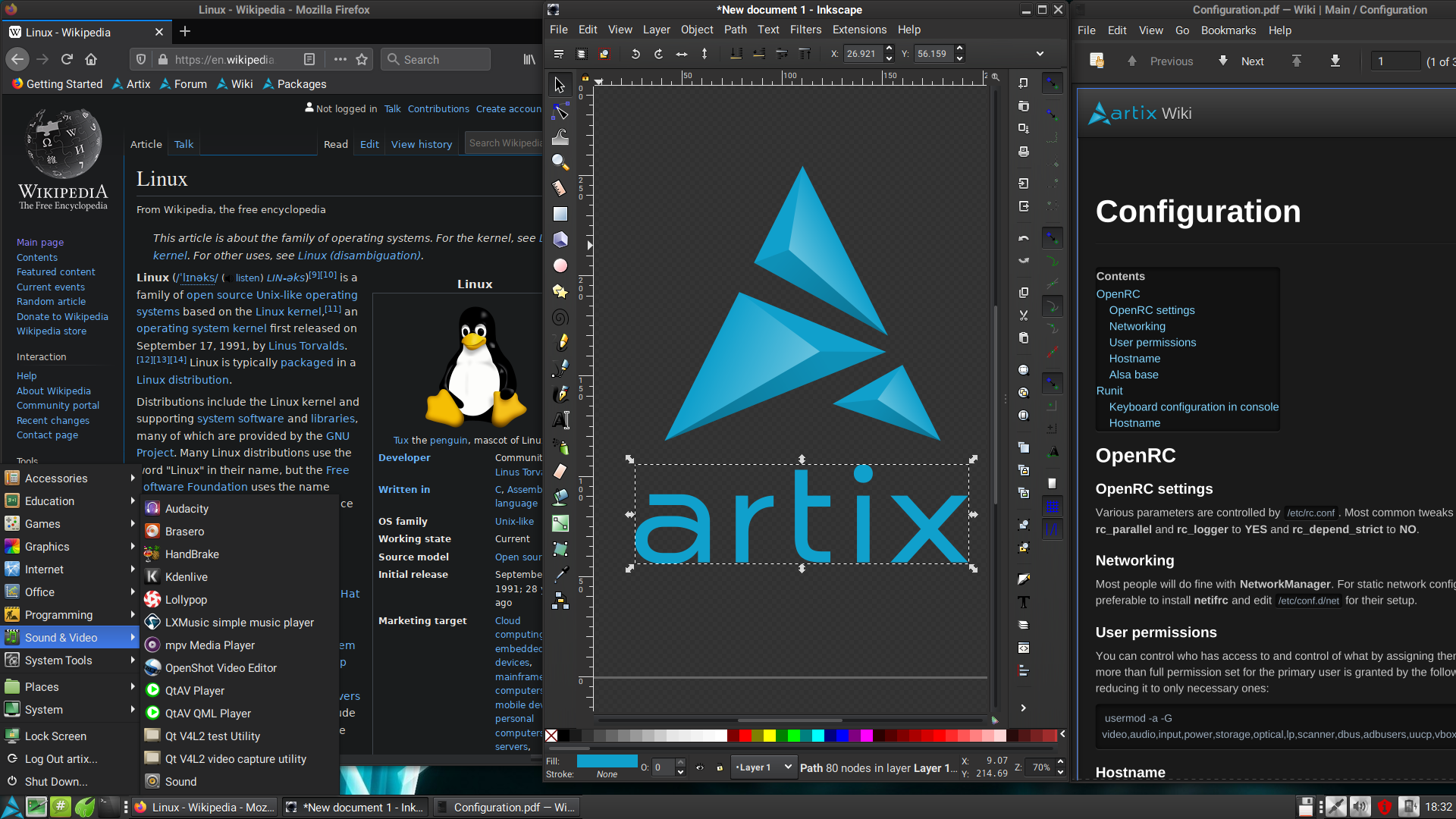
Screenshot of Artix community-gtk edition 2020-02 showcasing the default dark theme

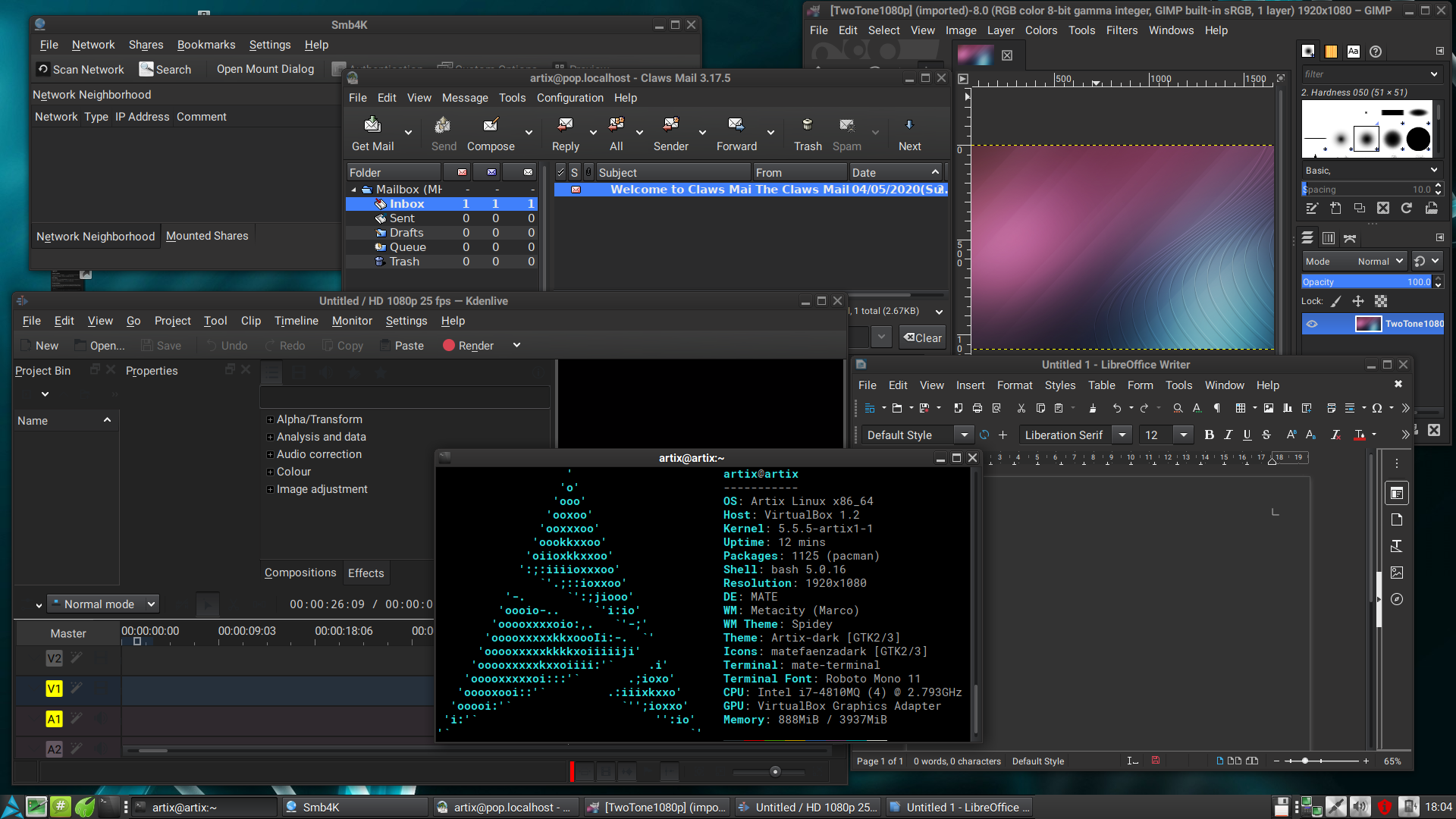
Screenshot of Artix community-gtk edition 2020-02 featuring a mix of GTK and Qt applications Kdenlive, the GIMP, LibreOffice Writer, Claws mail, Smb4K and a Neofetch dump

== Release history ==
Artix initially offered two installation environments, a base command-line ISO image and the graphical Calamares installer based on LXQt desktop, with an i3 version following later. Those early versions featured the OpenRC init system. The latest installation media are also available in a variety of desktop environments like LXDE, LXQt, XFCE, MATE, Cinnamon and KDE Plasma. Additionally, two unofficial community editions featuring GTK (XFCE and MATE) and Qt (KDE Plasma) desktops and a larger software base are offered, aiming at too-busy-to-customise or less experienced, novice users. All current installation media come in OpenRC, runit, s6, and dinit versions, with the exception of the community ISOs that offer OpenRC only. In April 2026, Artix Linux 2026.04 was published as the first official ISO release for 2026 with XLibre as the default display server, replacing X.org Server, and PipeWire as the default audio server, replacing PulseAudio. In August, Artix 2026.08 reverted back to Xorg and declared user services fully supported for OpenRC and Dinit.

== Artix and GNOME ==
On September 9, 2025, Artix dropped support for the popular desktop environment GNOME. This was due to GNOME's increasing dependency on systemd to the point where workarounds were deemed unfeasible.

== Reception ==
An early review published on DistroWatch on 27 November 2017 found a few bugs, but overall "Artix is working with a good idea [...] It's minimal, it is rolling and it offers a little-used init system. All of these I think make the project worthwhile." More critical, another review at the time from linux-community.de concluded "the results so far are not exactly motivating." Much more favourable reviews were later featured in both sites. A review from Softpedia gave Artix a 5 out of 5 stars rating, noting its "beautiful and pleasant graphical environments." Distrowatch readers' reviews on Distrowatch are mostly very favourable, with an average rating of 9.3 out of 10. A review on ZDNET praised it, stating it offered a "very fast boot time and outstanding all-around performance".
