= Void Linux =

Independent distribution developed entirely by volunteers

- Developer: Void Linux Team; Void Linux Community; Original developer: Juan Romero Pardines (xtraeme)
- OS family: Linux (Unix-like)
- Working state: Current
- Source model: Open source
- Initial release: 2008; 18 years ago
- Latest release: Rolling release / installation medium 2 February 2025; 18 months ago
- Marketing target: General purpose
- Package manager: XBPS; XBPS-SRC
- Supported platforms: i686; x86-64; ARMv6, ARMv7, ARMv8
- Kernel type: Monolithic (Linux)
- Userland: GNU + glibc or GNU + musl
- Influenced by: NetBSD
- Default user interface: Command-line interface (Bash shell as the default shell), Xfce
- License: Various licenses; Void-made software is mostly licensed under BSD 2-clause
- Official website: voidlinux.org

Void Linux is an independent Linux distribution that uses the X Binary Package System (XBPS) package manager, which was designed and implemented from scratch, and the runit init system. Excluding binary kernel blobs, a base install is composed entirely of free software (but users can access an official non-free repository to install proprietary software as well).

== History ==
Void Linux was created in 2008 by Juan Romero Pardines, a former developer of NetBSD to have a test-bed for the XBPS package manager. The ability to natively build packages from source using xbps-src is likely inspired by pkgsrc and other BSD ports collections.

In 2014, Void Linux switched from systemd to runit.

In May 2018, the project was moved to a new website and code repository by the core team after the project leader had not been heard from for several months.

== Features ==
Void is a notable exception to the majority of Linux distributions because it uses runit as its init system instead of the more common systemd used by other distributions. It is also unusual for allowing users to choose between glibc or musl for software repositories and installation media.

Void was the first distribution to incorporate LibreSSL as the default system cryptography library. In February 2021, the Void Linux team announced Void Linux would be switching back to OpenSSL on March 5, 2021. Among the reasons were the problematic process of patching software that was primarily written to work with OpenSSL, the support for some optimizations and earlier access to newer algorithms. A switch to OpenSSL began in April 2020 in the GitHub issue of the void-packages repository where most of the discussion has taken place.

Due to its rolling release nature, a system running Void is kept up-to-date with binary updates from the repositories in contrast with a point release. Source packages are maintained on GitHub and can be compiled using the xbps-src build system. The package build process is performed in a clean chroot environment, not tied to the current system, and most packages can be cross-compiled for foreign architectures.

As of May 2026, Void Linux supports Flatpak, which allows the installation of the latest packages from upstream repositories.

== Editions ==
Void Linux can be downloaded as a base image or as a flavor image. The base image contains little more than basic programs; users can then configure an environment for themselves. The flavor image contains a pre-configured Xfce desktop environment. Cinnamon, Enlightenment, LXDE, LXQt, MATE, and GNOME were previously offered as pre-packaged live images, but are no longer offered "to decrease the overhead involved with testing."

The live images contain an installer that offers a ncurses-based user interface. The default root shell is Dash.

Void Linux live image table
Platform	C library		Desktop environment
Platform	glibc	musl	Xfce
i686	Yes	No	Yes
amd64	Yes		Yes
ARM-based			
Raspberry Pi 1/2/3/4/5	Yes		No (Note: Can be installed separately.)

== Derivatives ==
Void Linux for PowerPC/Power ISA (unofficial) was a fork of Void Linux for PowerPC and Power ISA, with the project ending in early 2023. It supported 32-bit and 64-bit devices, big-endian and little-endian operation, and musl and glibc. Void-ppc maintained its own build infrastructure and package repositories, and aimed to build all of Void Linux's packages on all targets. It was a fork largely because of technical issues with Void Linux's build infrastructure.

Project Trident was a Linux distribution based on Void Linux, but was discontinued in March of 2022.

== Reception ==
In February 2023, Jesse Smith, of DistroWatch, said "The Void distribution is one of the fastest, lightest, most cleanly designed Linux distributions I've had the pleasure of using. Everything is trim, efficient, and surprisingly fast." Also, "Void has a relatively small repository of software [but] most of the key applications are there."
