= Neofetch =

System information shell tool

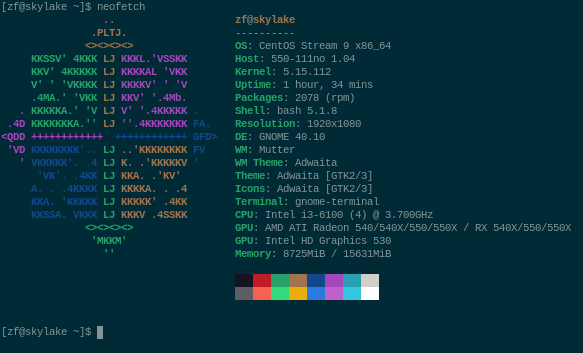
- Neofetch running on CentOS
- Developer: Dylan Araps
- Release: 31 December 2015; 10 years ago
- Final release: 7.1.0 / 2 August 2020; 6 years ago
- Written in: Bash 3.2
- Operating system: Linux, macOS, BSD, Windows, iOS, Android, GNU Hurd, Haiku, IRIX, MINIX, Solaris
- Size: 277 KB
- Available in: English
- Type: System information utility
- License: MIT License
- Repository: github.com/dylanaraps/neofetch

Neofetch is a system information tool written in the Bash shell scripting language. It displays a logo of the distribution, rendered in ASCII art, and a static display of the computer's basic hardware and software configurations and their versions. The display includes the operating system, the host (namely the technical name of the machine), uptime, package managers, the shell, display resolution, desktop environment, window manager, themes and icons, the computer terminal, CPU, GPU, and RAM usage. Neofetch can also display images on the terminal with w3m-img or Sixel in place of the ASCII logo art.

Neofetch development was discontinued on 26 April 2024, nearly four years after it was last updated.

== Derivations and legacy ==
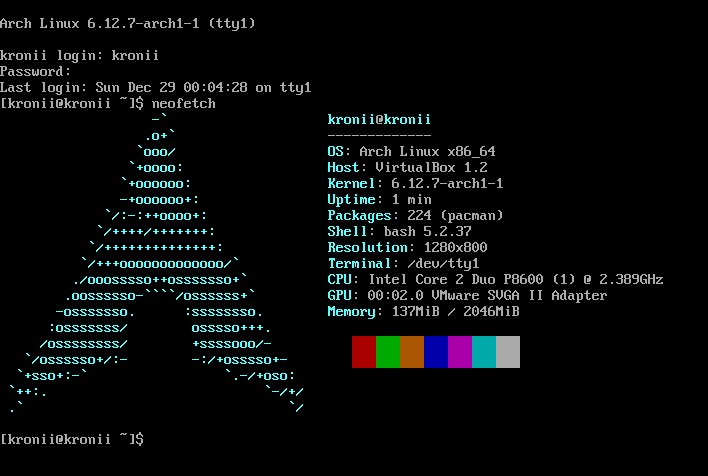
Neofetch on Arch Linux

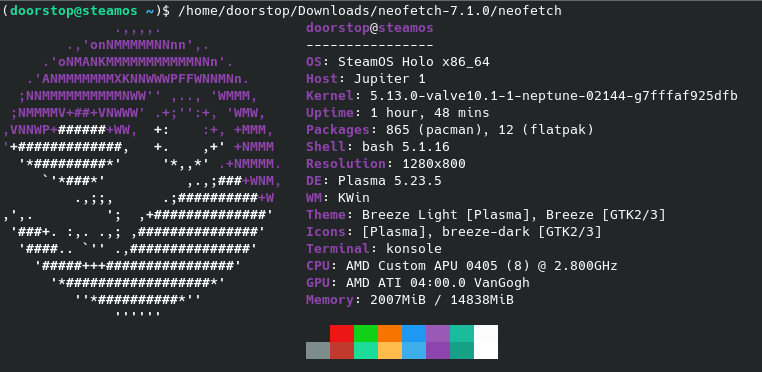
Neofetch on SteamOS

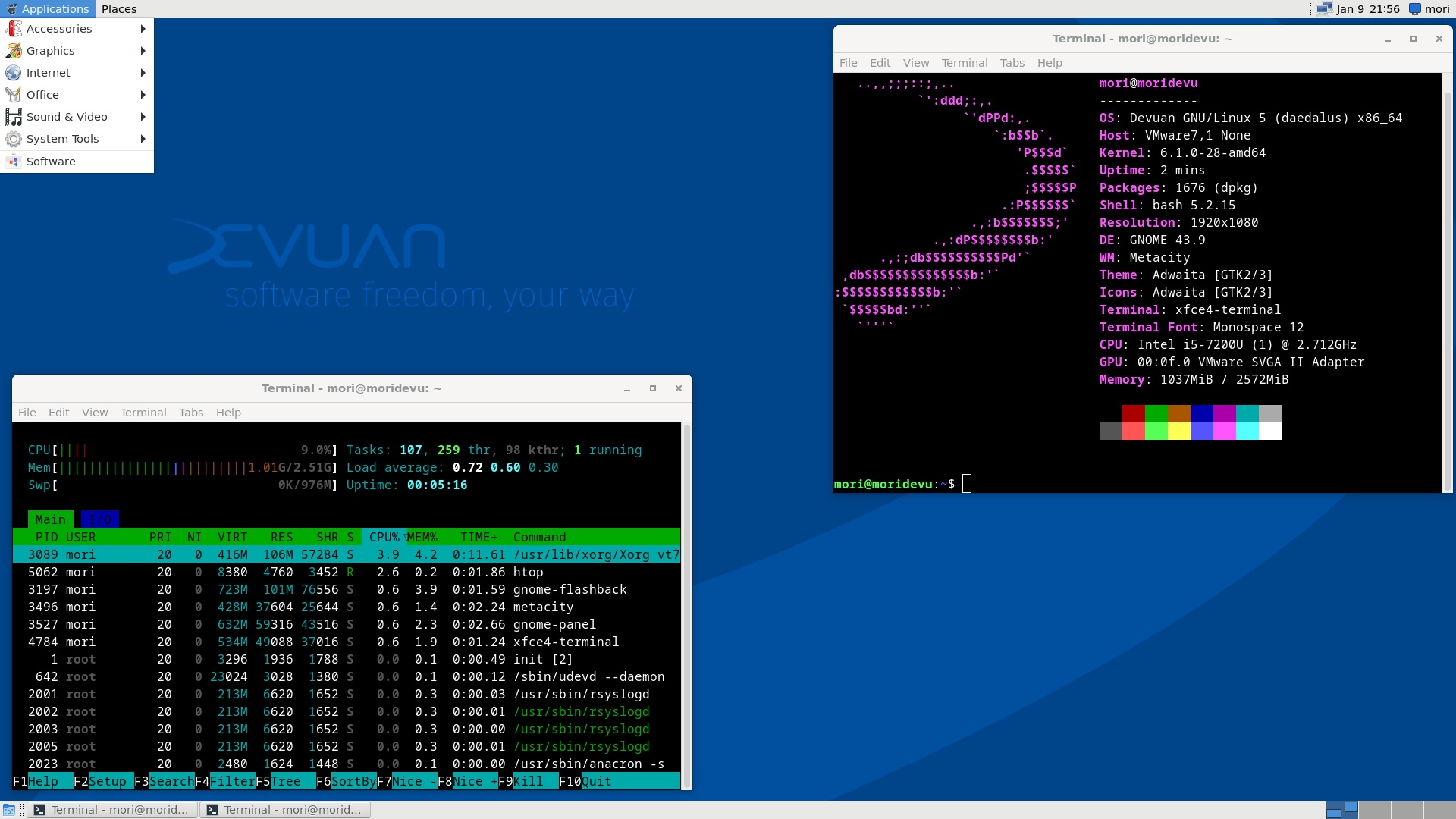
Neofetch on Devuan

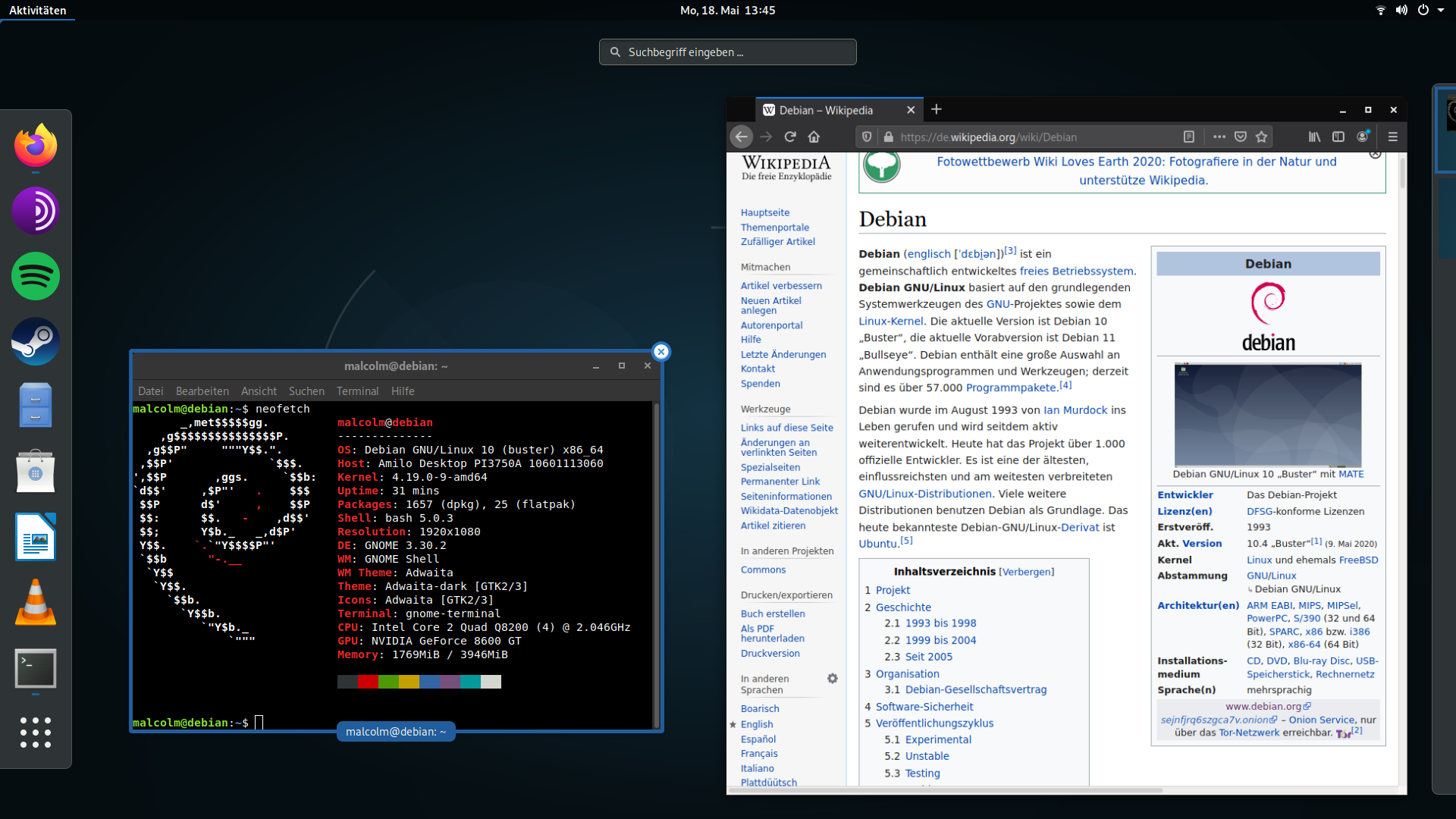
Neofetch on Debian Buster

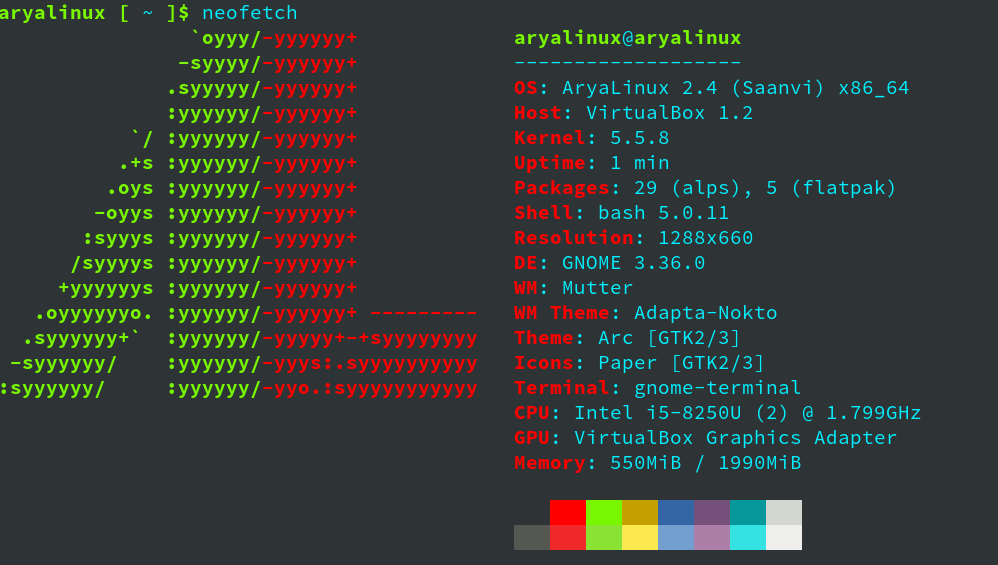
Neofetch on AryaLinux

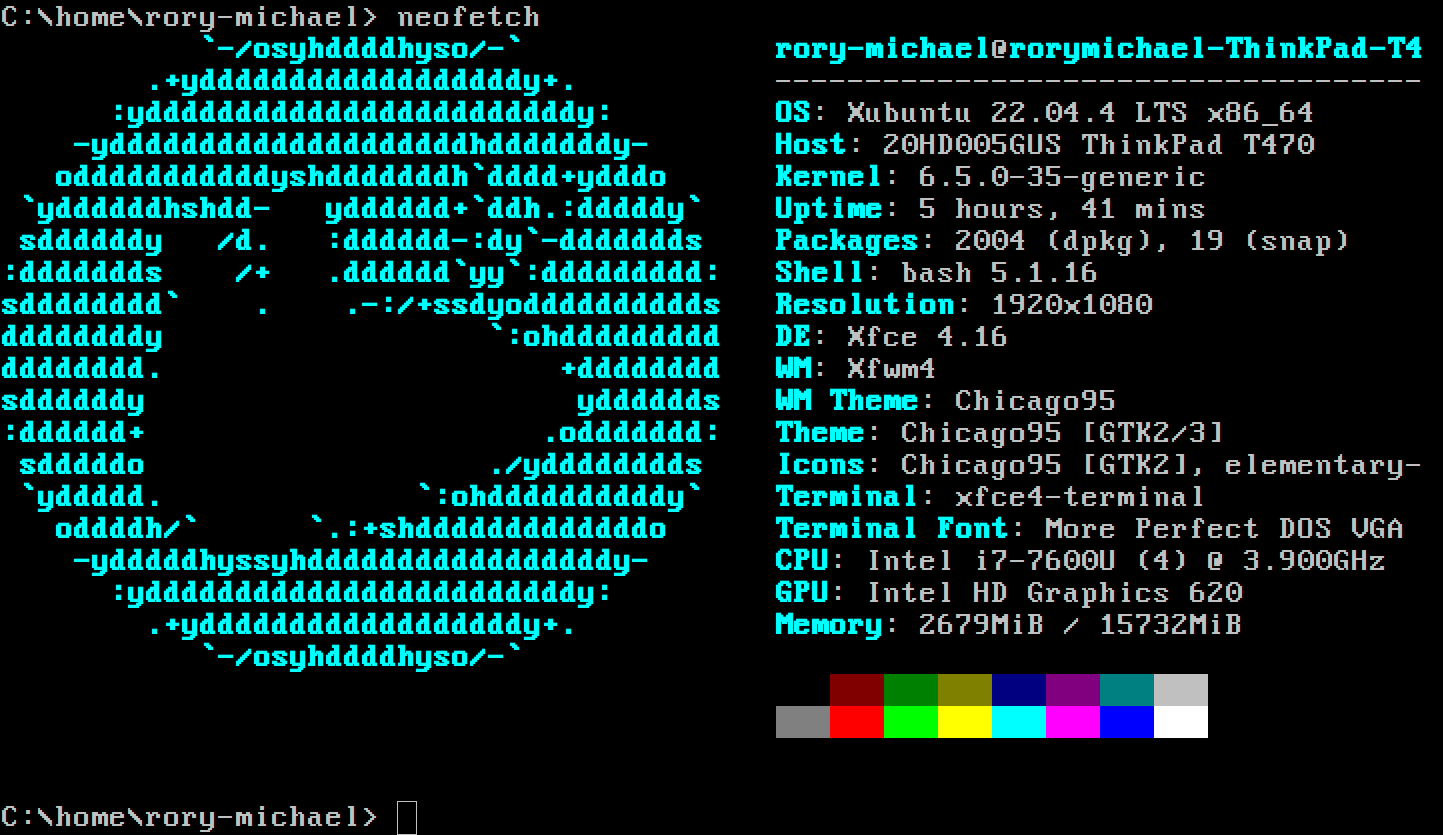
Neofetch on Xubuntu, with the Chicago95 theme

=== Major ===
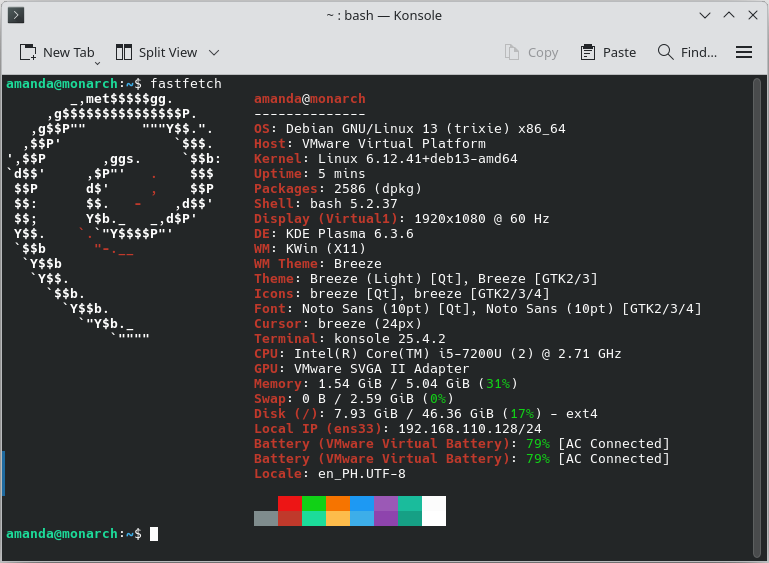
FastFetch, a major rewrite of NeoFetch, on Debian 13

Name	Programming language	Released as	Description	Source
ScreenFetch	Shell script	Source code	First announced in 2010, this tool is older than NeoFetch by six years. The tool's repo describes it as "The Bash Screenshot Information Tool" because the tool's output is intended to be included in screenshots that demonstrate themes.	
HyFetch	Shell script, Python and Rust	Source code	An updated fork of NeoFetch that can optionally render the OS logo in the colors of a chosen pride flag	
FastFetch	C	Portable Executable	A cross-platform, feature-rich, performance-minded, highly customizable replacement of NeoFetch, it comes with FlashFetch.exe, which is even faster, but its output is not customizable.	
WinFetch	PowerShell	Source code	A comprehensive reimplementation of NeoFetch in PowerShell, it specifically targets Microsoft Windows.	

=== Minor ===
Name	Programming language	Released as	Description	Source
aFetch	ANSI C	Source code	Derived from NerdFetch (see below), uFetch (see below), and BitFetch (taken offline), it only displays six lines of info, but all sixteen colors.	
CoalFetch	Java	Source code	A one-liner program that relies on WMI.	
DosFetch	Turbo Pascal v7.0	Portable Executable	Runs on DOS and exposes a few lines of information	
MySysInf (formerly fetch4FD)	Unknown	Portable Executable	Made for FreeDOS because its author was disappointed by DosFetch.	
nextFetch	Go	Source code	Not to be confused with the popular "Next-Fetch" for Next.js. Displays seven lines of info.	
NerdFetch	Shell script	Source code	Displays only four lines of info and six colors. Uses icons and glyphs from the Nerd Fonts, Phosphor, or Cozette projects (the user is expected to have them installed). Works on any OS except Windows.	
PasFetch	Pascal	Source code, binary (limited)	Displays eight lines of info, it is written for Linux only and is only compiled for the Arch repository.	
PerlFetch	Perl	Source code	Displays nine lines of info, and targets Linux, BSD, and macOS.	
pFetch	Bourne scripting language	Source code	Discontinued, now forked. Displayed 9 lines of info and supported 31 Linux distros, Android, Windows, macOS, Haiku, Minix, Solaris, IRIX, and SerenityOS.	
rFetch	Rust	Source code	Displays six lines of info and targets Linux only. Not to be confused with a REST client of the same name.	
RexxFetch	REXX	Source code	Supports ARexx.	
Should Work Everywhere Fetch (SWEF)	Lua	Source code	Displays only the OS name, kernel version number, window manager, and shell name, all of the user must know before running it. Supports Windows, Linux, macOS, Android, many others.	
Shadow wizard money fetch (SwmFetch)	Python	Source code	Displays five lines of trivial info, the sixteen colors, and the pixart of a wizard.	
uFetch	Shell script	Source code	Displays only seven lines of info and no colors. Instead of one script that covers multiple OSes, the uFetch project has released 38 scripts, each dedicated to a different OS.	

== Tools with similar output ==
Name	Programming language	Released as	Description	Source
cpufetch	C	Portable Executable	Displays CPU architecture details in a NeoFetch-like format.	
gpufetch	C++	Portable Executable	Displays GPU architecture details in a NeoFetch-like format.	
gfetch	Shell script	Source code	Displays the Git repository information for the current or selected folder (if it is a Git repo) in z NeoFetch-like format.	
