= Razor-qt =

Desktop environment for the X Window System

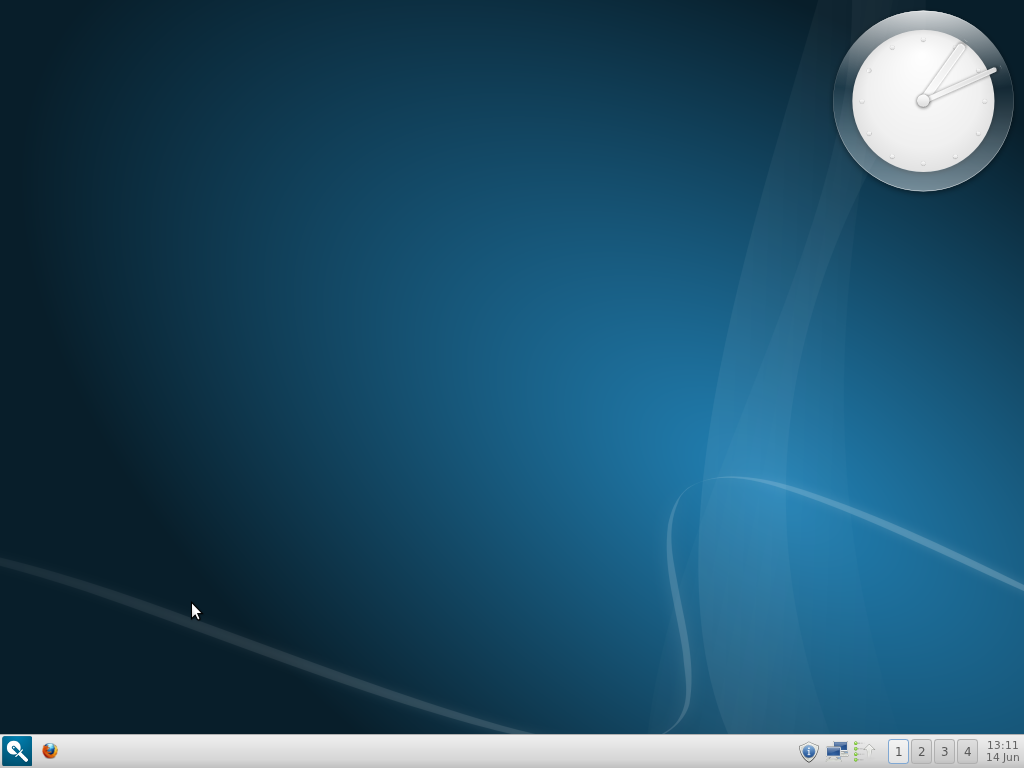
- Razor-qt 0.4.1 running on Linux Mint 12
- Developers: The Razor-qt Team, contributors
- Initial release: 2010
- Final release: 0.5.2 / 12 January 2013; 13 years ago
- Written in: C++, Qt
- Operating system: Unix-like
- Available in: Multilingual
- Type: Desktop environment
- License: GPL v2
- Website: none
- Repository: github.com/Razor-qt/razor-qt

Razor-qt is a discontinued free and open-source desktop environment. It was intended as a lightweight desktop environment based upon the Qt application framework, and was "tailored for users who value simplicity, speed, and an intuitive interface."

Development of Razor-qt has ceased, as it has merged with LXDE's Qt port to form LXQt.

== Overview ==
Razor-qt was still in the early stages of development. As of February 2012, the environment included a panel viewer and switcher, a desktop, an application launcher, a settings center and sessions. These components could be enabled or disabled by the user.

Razor-qt could be used with any modern X window manager such as Openbox, fvwm2, or KWin.

The memory consumption of Razor-qt was slightly above LXDE, using 114 MiB in a reviewer's test while LXDE used 108 MiB.

== Merge with LXDE ==
After LXDE developer Hong Jen Yee ported PCManFM to Qt in early 2013, he and other interested developers discussed a potential collaboration with Razor-qt, another open-source desktop environment with similar software design goals. The first release of the new product, LXQt v0.7.0, was made public on 2014-05-07.

== See also ==
- Comparison of X Window System desktop environments
