= Devuan =

Linux distribution based on Debian

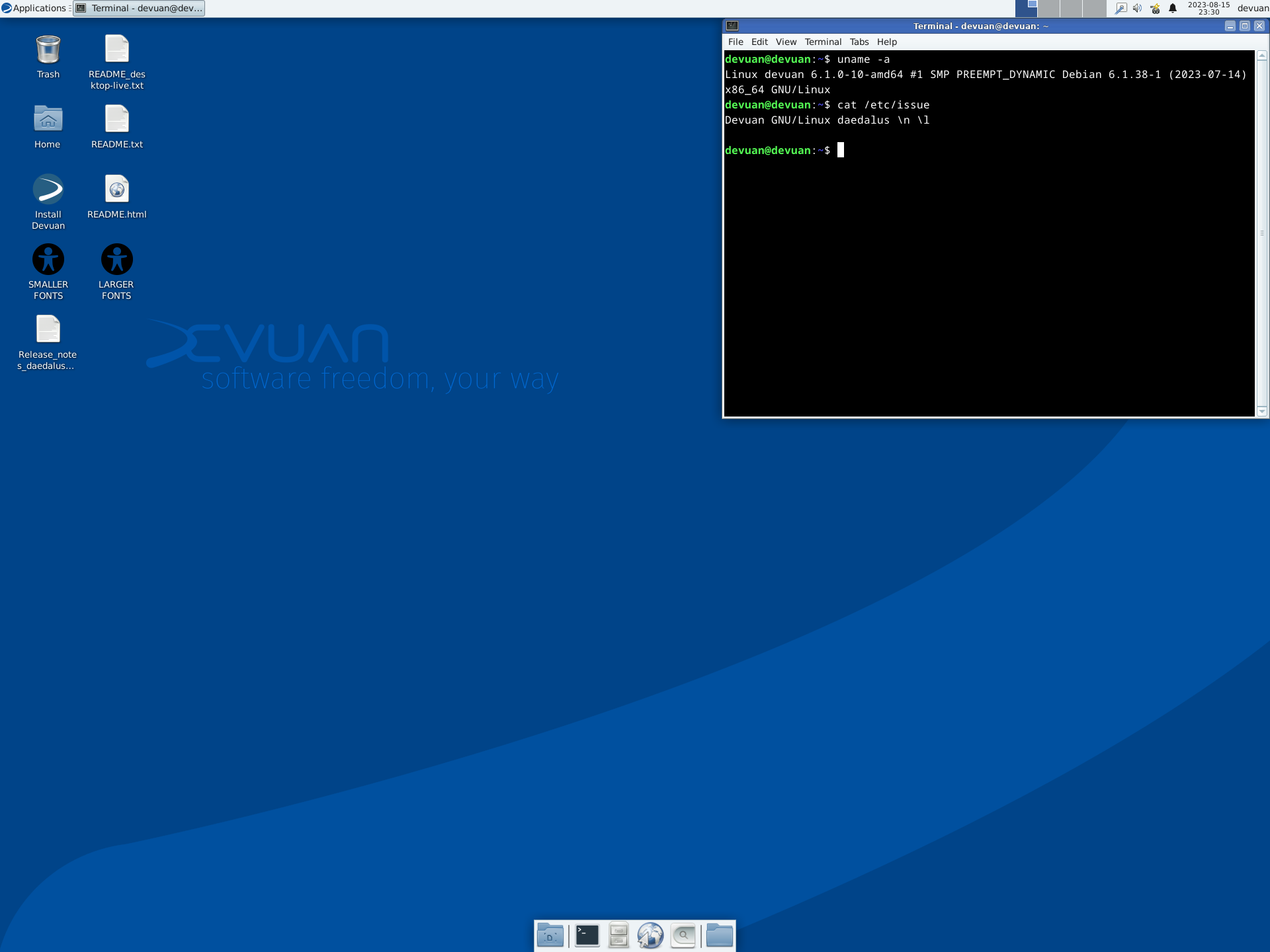
- Devuan with its default XFCE desktop running on a virtual machine (2023-08)
- Developer: Veteran Unix Admins
- OS family: Linux
- Working state: Current
- Source model: Open source
- Initial release: May 3, 2016; 10 years ago
- Latest release: 6.1 / 2 January 2026; 10 months ago
- Repository: git.devuan.org
- Package manager: APT (dpkg)
- Supported platforms: i386, amd64, ARM, ppc64el
- Kernel type: Monolithic (Linux kernel)
- Userland: GNU
- Default user interface: Xfce
- License: Various open source licenses (Note: Due to Devuan being based on Debian, most (if not all) Open Source software is probably available under DFSG compatible licenses.)
- Official website: www.devuan.org

Devuan is an open source Linux distribution based on Debian that aims to maintain compatibility and usability with other alternative init systems to avoid lock-in by systemd. Devuan offers sysvinit, runit and OpenRC as alternatives to systemd.

== Design principles ==
With the release of Debian 8, some developers and users started feeling alienated due to the project's adoption of systemd and removal of support for other existing init systems. This decision led to some Debian community members and developers to start a free-to-use fork of Debian without the use of systemd.

Devuan is very similar to Debian (for example, it ships with Firefox ESR as the default browser), but there are some differences as well (for example, Devuan's default and preferred desktop environment is XFCE).

== History ==
Instead of continuing the Debian practice of using Toy Story character names as release codenames, Devuan aliases its releases using minor planet names. The first stable release shared the Debian 8 codename Jessie. However, the Devuan release was named for minor planet 10464.

The first stable release of Devuan was published on May 25, 2017.

Devuan 2.0.0 ASCII was released on the 9th of June on 2018, version 2.1 was released on the 21st of November on 2019. This release provideded a choice of five different desktop environments at install time (offering XFCE, Cinnamon, KDE, LXQt, MATE), also having different window managers available in the repositories. It also provides installation options for choosing between sysvinit and OpenRC for the base init system. Also including an option between GRUB and LILO as the boot loader/manager. Devuan maintains a modified version of the Debian expert text installer, which has the ability to install only free software if the user chooses explicitly, while the live desktop image also initiates a customized graphical installer from Refracta (a derivative of Devuan.)

Devuan 3.0.0 Beowulf was released on June 3, 2020, based on Debian 10.4. Ppc64el has been added to the list of supported architectures. runit is now available as an alternative init system. Eudev and elogind are now used to replace some systemd functionality.

Devuan 4.0 Chimaera was released on October 14, 2021. It is based on Debian Bullseye (11.1) which made the use of the Linux kernel version 5.10

Devuan 5.0 Daedalus was released on August 15, 2023. It is based on Debian Bookworm (12.1) provided with Linux kernel version 6.1, there are a few new changes in Devuan's rootless startx for handling X11 servers, was now making the use of libseat1, this change enhanced user experience and the way for smoother and much more efficient operations, there is now a new Wayland GUI support without requiring the usage of elogind like Sway

Devuan 6.0 Excalibur was released on November 2, 2025. It is based on Debian Trixie (13) with Linux kernel 6.12.

== Packages ==
Devuan has its own package repository which mirrors upstream Debian, with local modifications made only when needed to allow for init systems other than systemd. Devuan does not provide systemd in its repositories but still retains libsystemd0 until it has removed all dependencies.

Amprolla is the program used to merge Debian packages with Devuan packages. It downloads packages from Debian and merges changes to packages that Devuan overrides. According to Repology the number of packages in Devuan Excalibur/6.1 is less but close to Debian Trixie/13.7; Devuan's unstable repository is almost identical to Debian's unstable in terms of available packages.

== Derivatives ==
In August 2022, Peppermint OS announced the release of Devuan-based ISOs, alongside their Debian-based ISOs.

Exe GNU/Linux is a Devuan derivative (since 2017) featuring the Trinity Desktop Environment and another LXDE version.

Star is another Devuan-based Linux distribution featuring several lightweight window managers, such as Openbox, Fluxbox, JWM, and i3.

Another Devuan (unstable/ceres) based operating system called Spaced Linux is a derivative of Devuan which promises to feel more familiar to use for new users, offering the MATE desktop environment pre-configured with Compiz.

== Version history ==
Version	Codename	Codebase	Release date	End of support
1	Jessie	Debian 8 "Jessie"	May 25, 2017	June 30, 2020
2	ASCII	Debian 9 "Stretch"	June 9, 2018	July 1, 2022
3	Beowulf	Debian 10 "Buster"	June 3, 2020	June 30, 2024
4	Chimaera	Debian 11 "Bullseye"	October 14, 2021	August 31, 2026
5	Daedalus	Debian 12 "Bookworm"	August 14, 2023	June 30, 2028
6	Excalibur	Debian 13 "Trixie"	November 2, 2025	TBA
7	Freia	Debian 14 "Forky"	TBA	TBA
8	Gryphon	Debian 15 "Duke"	TBA	TBA
unstable	Ceres	Debian "Sid"	Development branch	

Legend:
Unsupported
Supported
Latest version
Preview version
Future version
