= Peppermint OS =

Linux computer operating system

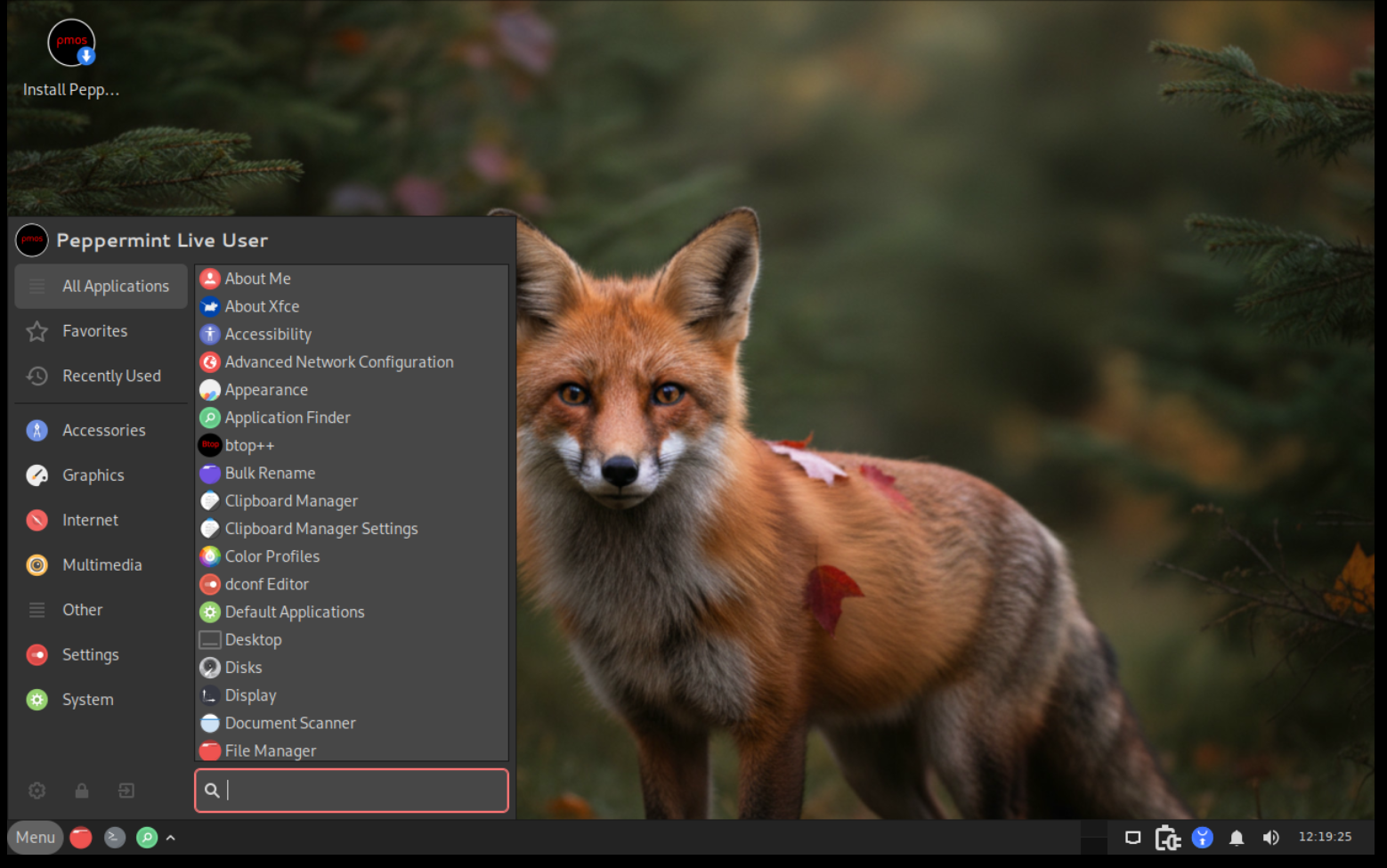
- Peppermint OS
- Developer: Peppermint OS Team
- OS family: Unix-like (Linux kernel)
- Working state: Current
- Source model: Open source
- Initial release: 9 May 2010; 16 years ago
- Latest release: 2026-11-18 / 12 June 2026; 5 months ago
- Repository: codeberg.org/Peppermint_OS
- Supported platforms: 64 bit (amd64)
- Kernel type: Monolithic (Linux)
- Userland: GNU
- Default user interface: Xfce, GNOME Flashback
- License: Free software licenses (mainly GPL)
- Official website: peppermintos.com

Peppermint OS is a Linux distribution based on Debian and Devuan Stable, and formerly based on Ubuntu. It uses the Xfce desktop environment. It aims to provide a familiar environment for newcomers to Linux that requires relatively low hardware resources to run.

== Design principles ==
Peppermint OS ships with few native applications and a traditional desktop interface. What originally made it unique was its approach to creating a hybrid desktop that integrated both web and native applications. In place of traditionally native applications for common tasks (word processing, image editing), it once shipped with the custom Ice application, which allows users to create site-specific browsers (SSBs).

In Peppermint OS, the open-source Firefox browser is used to enable a site-specific browser (SSB) for web applications. Instead of opening a browser and then visiting an application site, a dedicated browser window is integrated into the system for a specific application. Support for Firefox (alongside Chromium and Chrome web browsers) was added to the custom Ice application in 2015, allowing the creation of SSBs in a web browser window. Peppermint OS is a project where you can marry the cloud to the desktop. As with any Ubuntu based operating system, applications can be installed natively from Ubuntu compatible repositories, allowing one to run cloud-based applications alongside desktop software. Like any other Linux distribution, it allows installing packages like LibreOffice, GIMP, VLC, Skype, etc. Peppermint is built from Ubuntu and supports whatever Ubuntu supports. Peppermint OS ships with mintInstall, Synaptic, and GDebi to facilitate this.

Around October 2024, Peppermint started shipping with Librewolf as the default browser.

== Nomenclature ==
Peppermint's namesake is Linux Mint. The developers originally wanted to make use of configuration and utilities sourced from Linux Mint coupled with an environment that was less demanding on resources and more focused on web integration. They felt that the concept was a "spicier" version of Mint, so the name Peppermint was a natural fit.

While Linux Mint is known for its Cinnamon desktop, Peppermint originally used a default desktop that was a hybrid based mainly on selected components from it, LXDE, and XFCE that were significantly more lightweight. As of 2022, the hybrid desktop environment was phased out in favor of XFCE.

Peppermint has consistently released updates at a decent cadence since at least 2010, when it was first released.

== History ==
Peppermint OS was initially conceived at the Black Rose Pub in Hendersonville, North Carolina, USA, during a night of drinking and discussion about the future of desktop Linux. It was originally designed to be a social media-centric distribution.

Pre-alpha development builds consisted of a wide array of potential directions before the decision to fork Lubuntu was made. There was quite a bit of experimentation with KDE, E17, Adobe Air, and several different code bases during January and February 2010. Alpha builds using the Lubuntu 10.04 code base started in March 2010. Peppermint was released to a small group of private beta testers in April 2010 until its first public release.

- On May 9, 2010, Peppermint One was released. In less than a week, it received over 25,000 downloads. It soon outgrew its web host and switched to VPS.NET. VPS.NET became the project's first official sponsor.
- On June 20, 2010, Peppermint Ice was released with Chromium as the default browser, and featuring a blue and black theme to distinguish it from Peppermint One.
- On June 10, 2011, Peppermint Two was released. Combining aspects from the two previous editions, it packaged Chromium as its default browser alongside the Ice application for creating Site Specific Browsers. It was also the first edition of Peppermint to be available in both 32 and 64 bit versions.
- On July 23, 2012, Peppermint Three was released. Chromium stable repository was enabled by default; very light theme and default artwork; fewer default web applications in the menu; it shipped with GWoffice; and GIMP 2.8 was added to the Peppermint repository.
- On June 13, 2013, Peppermint Four was released. Peppermint Four was based on the Ubuntu 13.04 code base and used the LXDE desktop environment, but with Xfwm4 instead of Openbox as the window manager. Example games, Entanglement and First Person Tetris, were added. Also added were some metapackages for popular tasks such as graphic arts and photography to the Featured section of the Software Manager.
- On June 23, 2014, Peppermint Five was released. "With this release we are getting ready for the future. The technology landscape is constantly changing, and we are always responding to meet our user's needs. We are 100% driven to deliver an OS that is fast, secure, and available everywhere. Peppermint Five is another step in that direction." - Shane Remington - COO of Peppermint OS, LLC
- On May 31, 2015, Peppermint Six was released. "Peppermint is excited to announce the launch of our latest operating system, Peppermint Six. Lightweight and designed for speed, Peppermint Six delivers on that promise whether using software on your desktop, online, or using cloud based apps. I want to take this opportunity to thank Mark Greaves, who stepped up and produced most of what you see here in Peppermint Six. Mark is now playing a major role here at Peppermint by leading the development team. I think you will be impressed by what he and the others have put together in Peppermint Six." - Shane Remington - COO of Peppermint OS, LLC
- On June 24, 2016, Peppermint Seven was released. "Team Peppermint are pleased to announce our latest operating system Peppermint 7, it comes in both 32bit and 64bit editions with the latter having full UEFI/GPT/Secure Boot support baked in, a new version of Ice (our in house Site Specific Browser framework) is also included with full Firefox web browser support as well as Chromium / Chrome." - Mark Greaves (PCNetSpec) - Development Team Leader & Support Admin

On January 14, 2020, Peppermint CEO Mark Greaves (PCNetSpec) died in hospital. After taking over Peppermint from Shane Remington and Kendall Weaver shortly after Peppermint 5, Mark devoted his life to Peppermint with his family's support and went on to release more versions of Peppermint up to Peppermint 10 and a respin of Peppermint 10. The official announcement was made on the Peppermint forum and a memorial fund has been set up by his family to honour Mark's legacy.

On February 2, 2022, PeppermintOS released a new version for the first time in two years. Its main new features and changes include:

- Peppermint is now based on Debian Stable 64-bit, instead of Ubuntu or its derivatives,
- Dropped LXDE components in favor of Xfce,
- Nemo is side by side with Thunar and Nemo as the default file manager,
- No web browser is installed, a browser can be installed using Welcome to Peppermint application,
- Ubiquity has been replaced by Calamares for the system installer

On July 1, 2023, PeppermintOS released a new version based on Debian (Bookworm) and Devuan (Daedalus)

- During this year there was ARM and mini releases as well

On July 1, 2024, Peppermint released updated ISOs for their Flagship and Loaded builds.

On October 14, 2025, Peppermint released updated ISOs for their Flagship Re-based on Debian Trixie.

On June 12, 2026, Peppermint released updated ISOs for their Flagship Re-based on Devuan Excalibur.

On November 18, 2026 Peppermint released ISOs that moved to using the XLibre display server

== Packaged software ==
Native applications
- GDebi (package installer)
- Nemo (file manager)
- Peppermint Hub (configuration application)
- Synaptic (package manager)
- Transmission (BitTorrent client)

== Release history ==
Peppermint OS uses a hybrid release schedule. Updates are rolled out as needed in a rolling release fashion, but it is not a "true rolling release".

Essentially, Peppermint is a system that has rolling application updates and some system updates. Periodically, a Respin is released which incorporates minor bug fixes and recent updates.

=== Releases ===
Version	Date	Last respin
One	9 May 2010	01042011
Ice	20 July 2010	20110302
Two	10 June 2011	—N/a
Three	23 July 2012	—N/a
Four	13 June 2013	20131113
Five	23 June 2014	—N/a
Six	31 May 2015	—N/a
Seven	24 June 2016	—N/a
Eight	28 May 2017	—N/a
9	22 June 2018	—N/a
10	14 May 2019	20191210
Peppermint (Bullseye / Chimaera)	2 Feb 2022	—N/a
Peppermint OS (Bookworm / Daedalus)	1 July 2023	1 July 2024
Peppermint (Trixie)	14 Oct 2025	—N/a
Peppermint (Excalibur)	12 Jun 2026	—N/a

==== Peppermint One ====
- Initial Release May 9, 2010
- Respin 05222010 - Released May 22, 2010
- Respin 06172010 - Released June 23, 2010
- Respin 08042010 - Released August 9, 2010
- Respin 01042011 - Released January 4, 2011

Kernel updated to 2.6.35, HAL completely removed, Screenshot app replaced with PyShot, some low level utilities and user level apps updated (GNU Coreutils, Samba, PCManFM, LXTerminal, Firefox, and others).

==== Peppermint Ice ====
- Initial Release July 20, 2010
- Respin 10012010 - Released October 2, 2010
- Respin 20110302 - Released March 7, 2011

The LFFL repository was added. Some region specific SSBs, such as Hulu and Pandora, were removed from the default installation. Some space saving optimizations were made to the ISO.

==== Peppermint Two ====
- Initial Release June 10, 2011

Chromium is the default web browser, Ice SSB framework was written to work with Chromium, the Ice SSB application can remove SSBs as well as create them, added some additional example SSBs to the default install, entire look and feel has been revamped, Dropbox integration has been improved, Guayadeque music player is now the system default, LXKeymap has been included in the default install, Gedit replaces Leafpad as the default text editor.

==== Peppermint Three ====
- Initial Release July 23, 2012

Chromium Stable repository is now enabled by default, decided to go with a very light theme and default artwork, fewer default web applications in the menu, first distribution to ship with GWoffice (lightweight Google Docs client that runs independent of Chromium), GIMP 2.8 is in the Peppermint repo, moved back to Linux Mint's update manager, and a handful of minor things.

==== Peppermint Four ====
- Initial Release June 13, 2013
- Respin 20131113 - Released November 28, 2013

Better file system support, mtpfs is now supported, the typo on the shutting down screen is no longer present, the file manager is notably less buggy, and most system updates available from the upstream Ubuntu 13.04 code base have been installed.

==== Peppermint Five ====
- Initial Release June 23, 2014

Peppermint Five is based on the recent Ubuntu 14.04 Long Term Support (LTS) Linux release that debuted on April 17. The upstream code base will receive updates for five years. Peppermint Ice has been rewritten from scratch and is now significantly more stable and is more feature rich than past versions. The key new feature is that it now supports both Chrome and Chromium as a backend. Peppermint Control Center is our new settings app which provides an intuitive interface to customize and manage your workspaces, window behavior, keyboard and pointer settings, keyboard shortcuts and more. Peppermint Five delivers with PulseAudio now.

==== Peppermint Six ====
- Initial Release May 31, 2015

Peppermint Six is still built on the Ubuntu 14.04 LTS (Long Term Support) base, but has been moved to the Ubuntu 14.04.2 "point release", which includes the 3.16 kernel and an updated graphics stack. PCManFM has been replaced with the Nemo file manager. LXTerminal has been dropped in favor of Sakura. The Update Manager has been replaced with MintUpdate, but with the same settings as update-manager. Guayadeque and Gnome MPlayer have been replaced with VLC as a "one app to play them all". The default image viewer has been changed from Mirage to the EOG (Eye of Gnome). The xfce4-power-manager has been replaced by mate-power-manager, and i3lock replaces Light Locker as the default ScreenLock. Peppermint Six has also moved to the Gnome Search Tool which has a more intuitive user interface, and finer grained control of search criteria. The new Wallpaper Manager (based on Nitrogen) now makes wallpaper management a breeze. Linux Mint's USB creation tools "mintstick" are now included by default, making the creation of LiveUSBs from isohybrid ISO images, and the formatting of USB sticks, as simple as it gets.

- Respin 20150904 - Released September 6, 2015

Peppermint 6 64-bit now offers UEFI/Secure Boot support, allowing easy installation alongside Microsoft Windows 8/8.1/10 in dual/multi-boot configurations on GPT disks, or just installed on its own, without needing to switch to legacy BIOS mode (CSM) or disabling Secure Boot. A new version of Ice has been added to the respin with support for the Firefox web browser (alongside Chromium and Chrome web browsers), allowing the creation of SSB's that open in a Firefox window. Some slight tweaks have been made to the Peppermix-Dark theme. Stripes have been removed from the default menu, Nemo file manager, Synaptic package manager, etc. This respin also includes a few minor bug fixes and tweaks: Minimum disk space requirement for the installation has been adjusted downward from 5.3GB to 3.8GB in Ubiquity. Unnecessary xfce4-power-manager-data package leftovers, from the switch to mate-power-manager, have been removed. The duplicate keyboard shortcut in xbindkeys.conf, which caused windowshots via Alt+PrtSc to be saved to both the desktop and home directory, has been removed. Also, all updates to date, have been included in the ISO.

==== Peppermint Seven ====
- Initial Release June 24, 2016

Along with a shift to the Ubuntu 16.04 LTS (Long Term Support) code base, Peppermint continues to choose components from other desktop environments, and integrate them into one cohesive package, along with their own in-house software. Whilst staying with LXDE core session management for lightness and speed, Peppermint listened to user demands for a more modern, functional, and customizable main menu system and switched out LXPanel in favor of the Xfce4-Panel and Whisker Menu. 'Peppermint Settings Panel' was added to consolidate settings all into one place. Due to Google's dropping of 32-bit Chrome and the move to PPAPI plugins (which effectively ends Flash support in 32-bit Chromium) Peppermint has now moved back to the Firefox web browser for the first time since Peppermint One. Because Firefox is known to have some issues with dark GTK themes, such as white lettering on white backgrounds, Firefox has been locked to a light theme, independent of the system default. For additional versatility, a simple to use 'Firefox Themer' application was created, which allows users to unlock/relock the Firefox theming. 'Ice' now fully supports the creation and removal of SSB's for Firefox, Chromium, and Chrome. Peppermint 7 has a new look, flatter than previous editions (though not too flat) with a dark GTK theme by default and colorful icon choices. A small collection of background images has been added to the desktop, with the kind permission of photographer Ray Bilcliff. The text editor has been switched from GEdit to Pluma because of the odd way GEdit now handles window decorations. There are also many other small refinements squeezed into Peppermint 7, indeed a definitive and exhaustive list that would make this summary unreadable. Take it for a spin and see what you can find.

==== Peppermint Eight ====
- Initial Release May 28, 2017

Peppermint Eight is still based on the Ubuntu 16.04 LTS (Long Term Support) code base, but now with the 4.8 kernel series and an upgraded graphics stack. These additions offer rolling kernel and graphics stack upgrades as soon as they become available upstream. Mesa 17.0.2 is implemented for an improved gaming experience. The usability of the OS has been expanded on with improved keyboard layout handling, auto-mounting of external volumes, NFS/exFAT support out of the box, an augmented Peppermint Settings Panel, and more.

==== Peppermint 9 ====
- Initial Release: June 22, 2018

In Peppermint Nine, lxrandr replaced with xfce4-display-settings for screen settings. Menulibre is now installed as default, file manager Nemo got a new item in right-click context menu "Send by mail". Based on the 18.04 LTS (long term support) code base.

==== Peppermint 10 ====
- Initial Release: May 17, 2019
- Respin 20191210 - Released December 18, 2019

Peppermint 10 is based on the 18.04 LTS (long-term support) version of Ubuntu.

==== Peppermint OS (Bullseye / Chimaera) ====
- Initial Release: Feb 2, 2022 - Peppermint switched from Ubuntu to Debian
- Update Release: October 2, 2022 - Peppermint adds Devuan variant
- Update Release: November 6 & 7, 2022 - ICE replaced with Kumo

==== Peppermint OS (Bookworm / Daedalus) ====
- Initial Release: July 1, 2023 - New branding
- Updated Release: July 7, 2023 - ARM Releases
- Update Release: October 1, 2023 - Devuan Release
- Update Release: October 15, 2023 - Mini Releases Debian / Devuan
- Update Release: Jul 1 2024 - Mainline updated and Peppermint Loaded released

==== Peppermint OS (Excalibur ) ====
- Update Release: June 12, 2026 - Mainline updated and Peppermint Flagship released

==== Peppermint OS (Trixie ) ====
- Update Release: October 14, 2025 - Mainline updated and Peppermint Flagship released.
- Update Release: November 18, 2025 - Mainline updated Peppermint Debian Flagship released with XLibre
