= LXQt =

Linux desktop environment

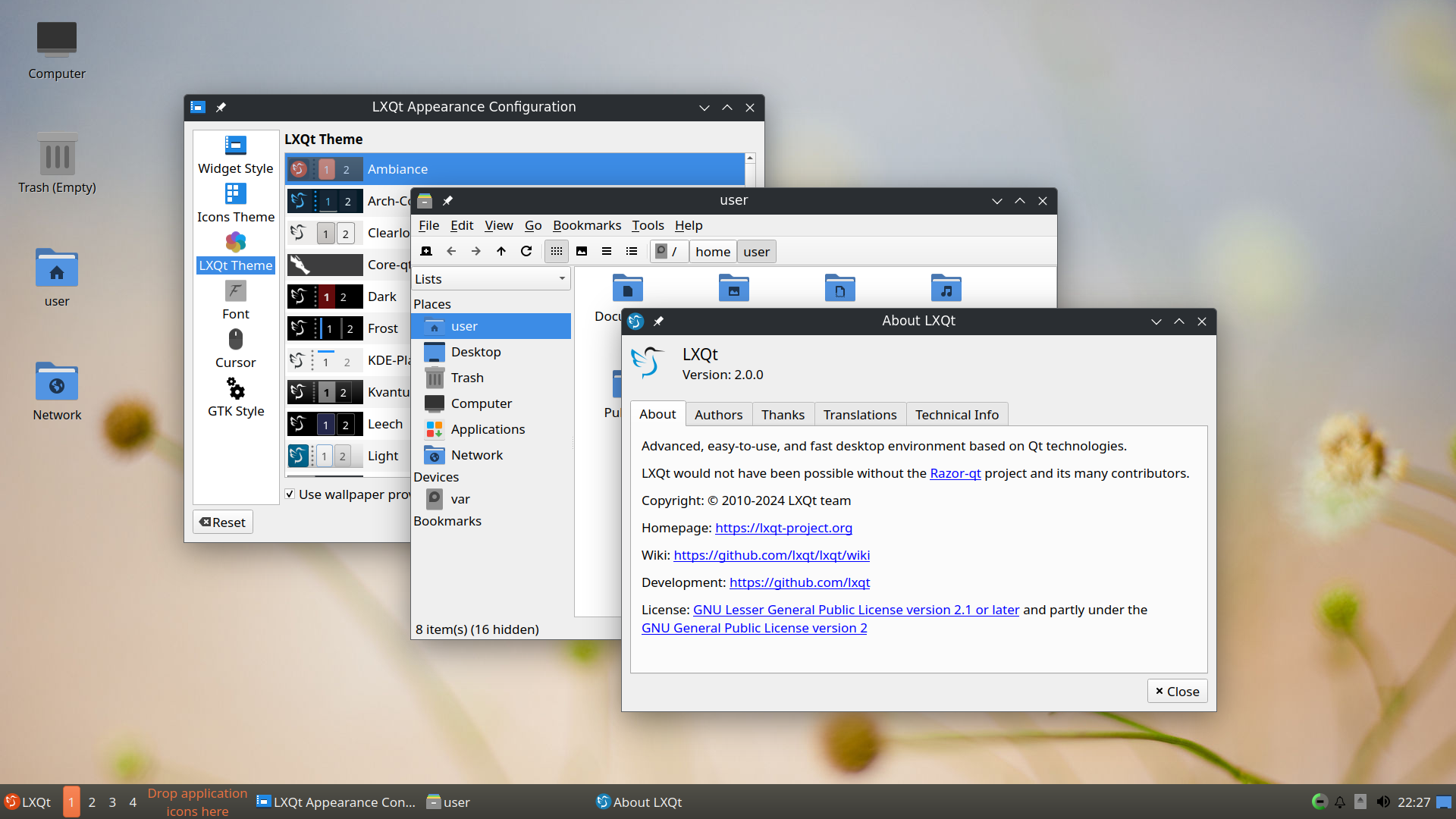
- LXQt 2.0.0 Screenshot
- Original author: Hong Jen Yee (“PCMan”)
- Developer: The LXQt team
- Release: July 21, 2013; 13 years ago
- Stable release: 2.5.0 / 5 November 2026; 0 days ago
- Written in: C++, C, Qt
- Operating system: Unix-like
- Available in: Multilingual
- Type: Desktop environment
- License: GPL, LGPL
- Website: lxqt-project.org
- Repository: github.com/lxqt

LXQt is a free and open source lightweight desktop environment. It was formed from the merger of the LXDE and Razor-qt projects.

Like its GTK predecessor LXDE, LXQt does not ship or develop its own window manager; instead, LXQt lets the user decide which (supported) window manager they want to use. Linux distributions commonly default LXQt to Openbox, Xfwm4, or KWin.

== History ==
Dissatisfied with GTK 3, LXDE maintainer Hong Jen Yee experimented with Qt in early 2013 and released the first version of a Qt-based PCMan File Manager on 26 March 2013. He clarified, though, that this means no departure from GTK in LXDE, saying "The GTK and Qt versions will coexist". He later ported LXDE's xrandr front-end to Qt.

On 3 July 2013 Hong Jen Yee announced a Qt port of the full LXDE suite, and on 21 July 2013, Razor-qt and LXDE announced that they had decided to merge the two projects. This merge meant that the GTK and the Qt versions coexisted in the short term, but eventually development of the GTK version significantly slowed and most efforts were focused on the Qt port. The merge of LXDE-Qt and Razor-qt was renamed LXQt, and the first release, version 0.7.0, was made available on 7 May 2014.

With the 0.13 release on 21 May 2018 the LXQt project formally split from LXDE with the move to a separate GitHub organization.

== Software components ==
LXQt consists of many modular components, some of them depending on Qt and KDE Frameworks 5.

Name	Dependencies (besides Qt)	Comments
QTerminal		Use the command line, composed for and now part of LXQt
LXImage-Qt		Image viewer
lxqt-menu-data		Files required for freedesktop.org desktop menus
lxqt-about		About dialog
lxqt-admin		System administration tool
lxqt-archiver		File archiver
lxqt-common		Common files (graphics files, themes, desktop entry files ...)
lxqt-config	KScreen	System settings center
lxqt-globalkeys		Daemon and library for global keyboard shortcuts registration
lxqt-notificationd		Notification daemon
lxqt-openssh-askpass		openssh password prompt
lxqt-panel	Solid	Desktop panel (taskbar)
lxqt-policykit		Polkit authentication agent
lxqt-powermanagement	Solid	Power management daemon
lxqt-qtplugin		Qt platform integration plugin (all Qt-based programs can adopt settings of LXQt)
lxqt-runner		Application launcher
lxqt-session		session manager
lxqt-sudo		GUI frontend for sudo/su
menu-cache		
ObConf-Qt		Openbox configuration tool written in Qt
pavucontrol-qt	PulseAudio	Volume manager for PulseAudio
compton-conf		GUI configuration tool for Compton X composite manager (metacity ⇒ xcompmgr ⇒ dcompmgr ⇒ Compton)
PCManFM-Qt		File manager, Qt port of PCManFM
qt-gtk-engine		Theming GTK 3 programs with Qt styles
ScreenGrab		Screenshot program

== Adoption ==
Operating System	Officially Supported	Notes
Alpine Linux	Yes	Can be installed with the built-in setup-desktop script.
Arch Linux	Yes	Offered as a desktop in archinstall. Also other Arch Linux based Linux distributions.
Artix Linux	Yes	A LXQt ISO is available.
Debian	Yes	Also other Debian-based Linux distributions.
Fedora Linux	Yes	Available as a Fedora Spin.
Gentoo Linux	Yes	Defaults to KWin when installing the meta package.
Lubuntu	Yes	Official Ubuntu flavor with LXQt by default.
Manjaro	Yes	
Void Linux	Yes	Fully supported but needs to be installed separately by the user.
NixOS	Yes	NixOS packages LXQt and is available in their installer.
openSUSE	Yes	GeckoLinux offers a LXQt ISO.

== Version history ==
LXQt releases
Version	Date	Key features
0.7	7 May 2014	
0.8	13 Nov 2014	bringing full Qt 5 compatibility
0.9	8 Feb 2015	Featuring heavy internal cleanups and refactorings. Compatibility with Qt 4 was dropped, requiring Qt 5 & KDE Frameworks 5. Qt 5.3 is now the minimum required version.
0.10	2 Nov 2015	
0.11	24 Sep 2016	To address concerns that LXQt being Qt-based might cause heavy memory usage, this release was benchmarked, revealing that LXQt used slightly less memory than Xfce, and that the "memory usage of LXQt is quite similar to the original LXDE (gtk2) while many new features are added".
0.12	21 May 2017	minimum Qt version 5.6.1
0.13	21 May 2018	All packages are ready for Qt 5.11
0.14	25 Jan 2019	
0.15	24 Apr 2020	
0.16	4 Nov 2020	Three new themes; Clearlooks, Leech and Kvantum.
0.17	15 Apr 2021	
1.0.0	5 Nov 2021	
1.1.0	15 Apr 2022	
1.2.0	5 Nov 2022	
1.3.0	15 Apr 2023	
1.4.0	5 Nov 2023	Last Version based on Qt 5.15
2.0.0	15 Apr 2024	First version based on Qt 6.6
2.1.0	5 Nov 2024	Optional experimental Wayland session added
2.2.0	17 Apr 2025	Enhanced Wayland support
2.3.0	5 Nov 2025	
2.4.0	20 Apr 2026	
2.5.0	5 Nov 2026	Target Qt 6.10 toolkit and no more LXDE dependencies remain
Unsupported Supported Latest version

== See also ==
- Razor-qt
- Comparison of X Window System desktop environments
