= LXDE =

Lightweight X11 desktop environment for Linux and BSD

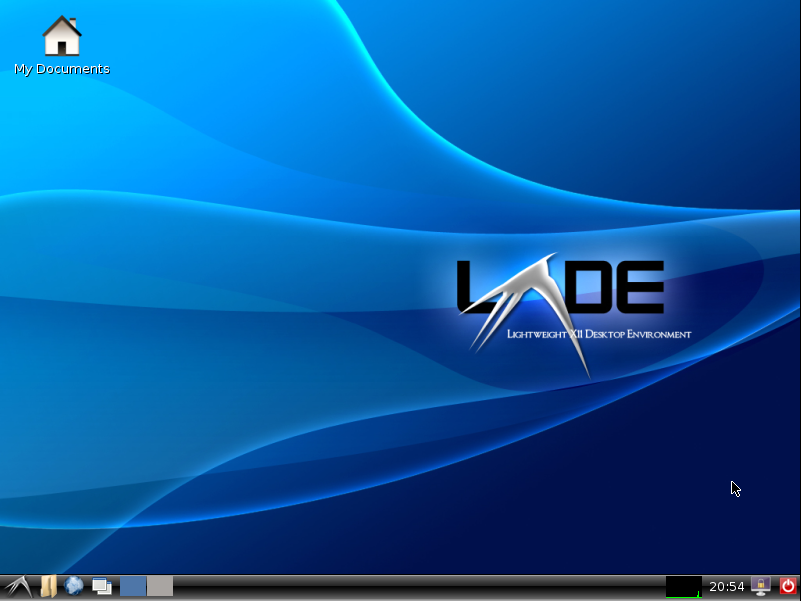
- Default LXDE desktop
- Original author: Hong Jen Yee ("PCMan")
- Developer: The LXDE Team
- Release: 2006; 20 years ago
- Final release: 0.10.1 / 25 February 2021; 5 years ago
- Written in: C (GTK 2, GTK 3)
- Operating system: Unix-like
- Platform: Linux, BSD
- Type: Desktop environment
- License: GPL, LGPL
- Website: www.lxde.org
- Repository: github.com/lxde

LXDE (abbreviation for Lightweight X11 Desktop Environment) is a free desktop environment with comparatively low resource requirements. This makes it especially suitable for use on older or resource-constrained personal computers such as netbooks or system on a chip computers.

LXDE was written in the C programming language, using the GTK 2 toolkit, and runs on Unix and other POSIX-compliant platforms, such as Linux and BSDs. The LXDE project aims to provide a fast and energy-efficient desktop environment.

LXDE uses rolling releases for its individual components (or for groups of components with coupled dependencies). The default window manager used is Openbox, but one can configure a third-party window manager for use with LXDE, such as Fluxbox, IceWM or Xfwm. LXDE includes GPL-licensed code as well as LGPL-licensed code.

== History ==
The project was started in 2006 by Taiwanese programmer Hong Jen Yee (Chinese: 洪任諭; pinyin: Hóng Rènyù), also known as PCMan, when he published PCManFM, a new file manager and the first module of LXDE.

In 2010, tests suggested that LXDE 0.5 had the lowest memory-usage of the four most-popular desktop environments of the time (the others being GNOME 2.29, KDE Plasma Desktop 4.4, and Xfce 4.6), and that it consumed less energy, which suggested mobile computers with Linux distributions running LXDE 0.5 drained their batteries at a slower pace than those with other desktop environments.

=== Qt port ===
Dissatisfied with GTK 3, Hong Jen Yee experimented with Qt in early 2013 and released the first version of a Qt-based PCManFM on 26 March 2013.

On 3 July 2013 Hong announced a Qt port of the full LXDE suite, and on 21 July Razor-qt and LXDE announced that they would merge the two projects. This merger meant that the GTK and the Qt versions would coexist for some time but, eventually, all original team efforts focused on the Qt port, LXQt.

=== GTK 3 port ===
As of May 2020, there is an experimental GTK 3 port developed by the Arch Linux community. GTK 3 versions have already been developed for the following components: LXAppearance, LXAppearance-ObConf, LXDE-common, LXDE-icon-theme, LXDM, LXhotkey, LXInput, LXLauncher, LXPanel, LXRandR, LXSession, LXTask, LXTerminal, Openbox, PCManFM. One advantage of using GTK 3 is that GTK 3 programs run natively on Wayland. PCManFM is a popular file manager for use with tiling window managers and hence, having a Wayland-native PCManFM is useful for people that use Sway.

=== Current development ===
Despite the original team moving to LXQt development, some other developers continued to maintain LXDE on GitHub and, as of March 2021, there are fresh commits to keep the GTK 2 version updated. As of July 2019, the LXTerminal release is based on GTK 3 to avoid dependencies on the old VTE lib.

== Availability ==
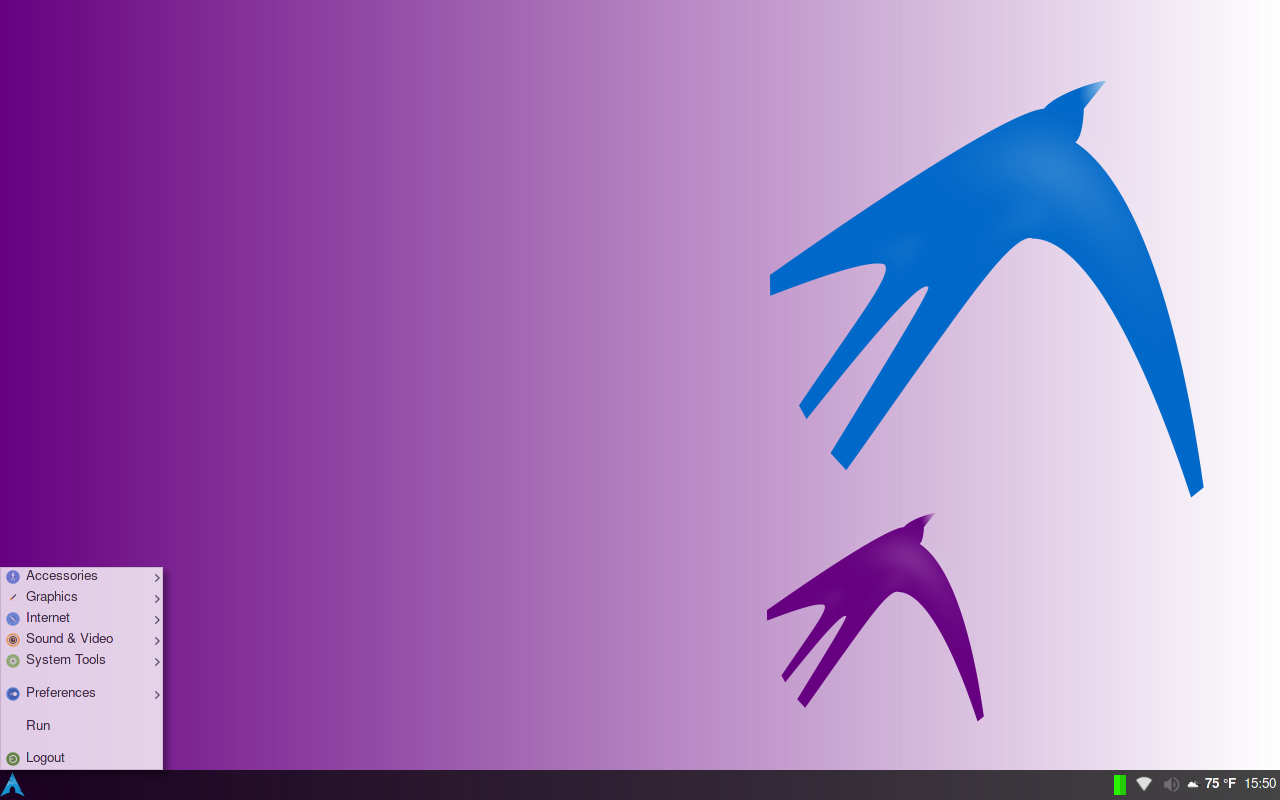
LXDE desktop on Arch Linux

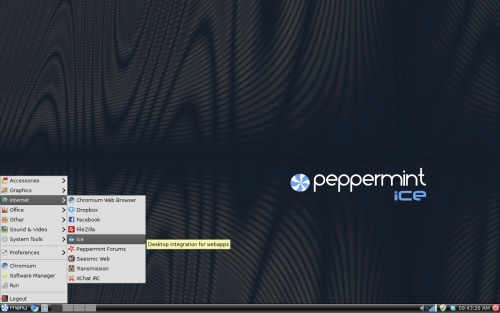
LXDE desktop on Peppermint Linux OS

Default desktop

- Loc-OS
- Knoppix
- LXLE Linux
- Trisquel Mini
- wattOS

Alternative desktop

- Arch Linux
- Artix Linux
- Debian
- Devuan
- Fedora
- Raspberry Pi OS (later models use a heavily modified fork of LXDE called PIXEL which eventually added Wayland support, using Wayfire or labwc compositors)

Former default desktop

- Lubuntu (replaced by LXQt in 2018)
- Artix Linux (now available as an alternative desktop)
- Peppermint OS (replaced by Xfce in 2022)

== Software components of LXDE ==
Unlike other major desktop environments such as GNOME, the components of LXDE have few dependencies and are not tightly integrated. Instead, they can be installed independently of each other or LXDE itself.

Components	Descriptions	Notes
PCMan File Manager	File manager and Desktop metaphor provider	
LXInput	Mouse and keyboard configuration tool	
LXLauncher	Easy-mode application launcher	
LXPanel	Desktop panel	
LXSession	X session manager	
LXAppearance	GTK theme switcher	
GPicView	Image viewer	
LXMusic	A frontend for the XMMS2 audio player	
LXTerminal	Terminal emulator	LXTerminal can be configured to hide the menu bar and the scrolling bar
LXTask	Task manager	
LXRandR	A GUI to RandR	
LXDM	X display manager	
LXNM	Lightweight network connection helper daemon. Supports wireless connections (Linux only).	Discontinued
Leafpad	Text editor	Not developed by the LXDE project
Openbox (Fluxbox, IceWM and Xfwm are also supported)	Window manager	Not developed by the LXDE project
ObConf	A GUI tool to configure Openbox	Not developed by the LXDE project
Xarchiver	File archiver	Not developed by the LXDE project

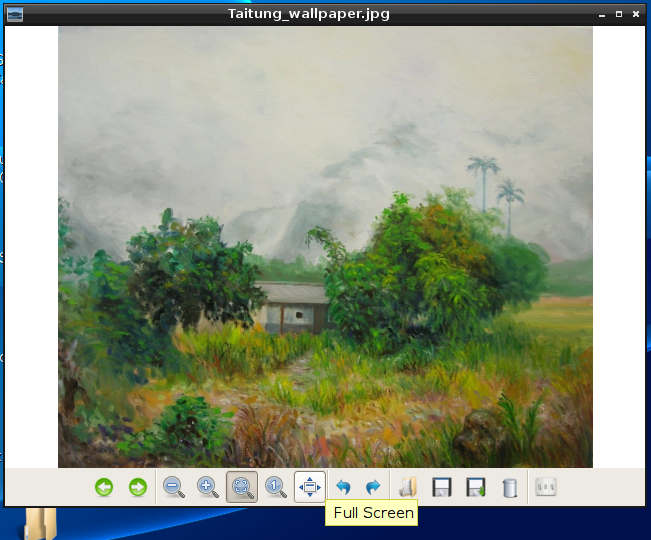
GPicView

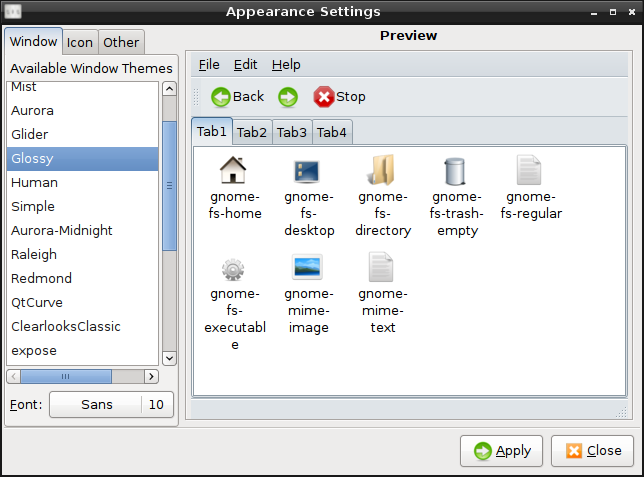
LXAppearance

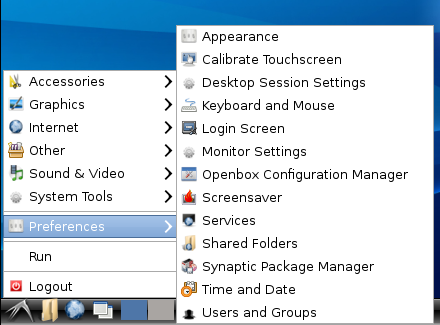
LXPanel

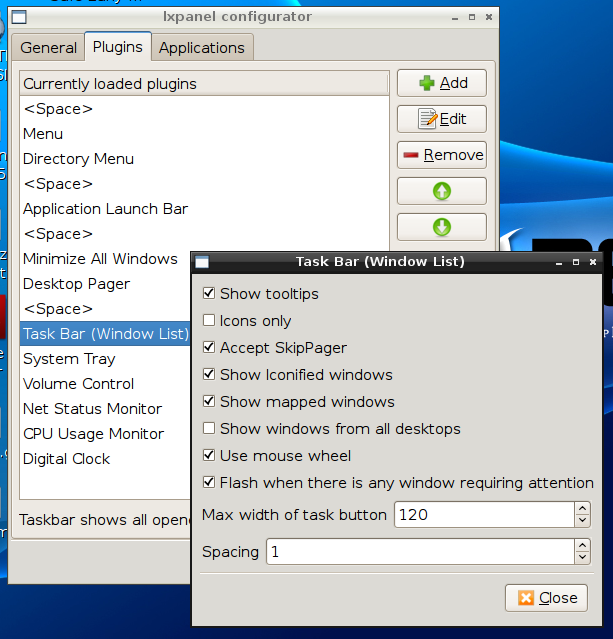
LXPanel Preferences

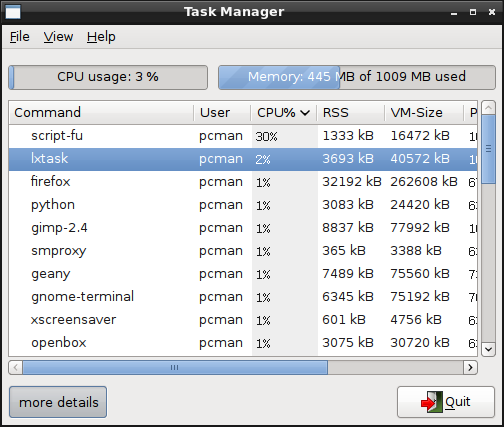
LXTask

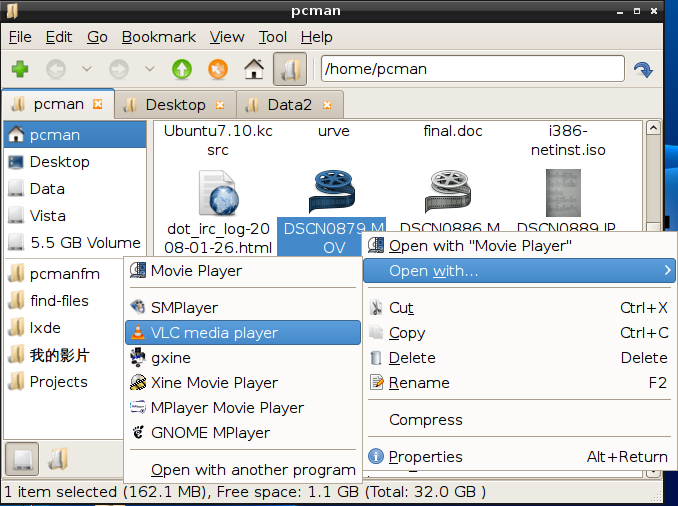
PCManFM

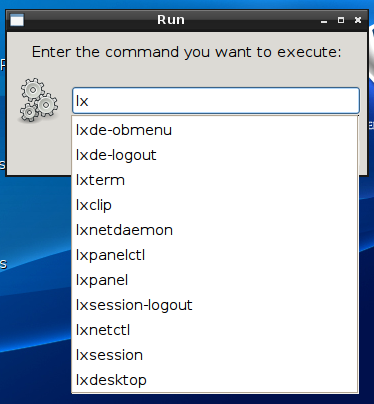
Autocompletion of Panel tasks

== See also ==
- LXQt – A lightweight desktop environment and spiritual successor to LXDE
- Xfce – Another lightweight desktop environment built using GTK
- Comparison of X Window System desktop environments
