= Puavo =

- Developer: Opinsys
- OS family: Linux (Unix-like)
- Working state: Current
- Source model: Open source
- Marketing target: Educational purpose
- Kernel type: Monolithic (Linux)
- Default user interface: GNOME
- License: GPL
- Official website: puavo.org

Puavo is a management software and a Debian-based operating system for schools. It consists of Puavo Web and Puavo OS.

== Puavo Web ==
Puavo Web manages users and the devices. External applications with LDAP support can be connected to the Puavo database.

== Puavo OS ==
The operating system Puavo OS has an Gnome-Desktop; Firefox and LibreOffice are pre-installed. Older computers are supported. Puavo OS has roots in the Linux Terminal Server Project.

== History ==
Puavo has been developed by Opinsys for Finnish schools since 2005. Individual schools in Germany and Switzerland also use the software.

== See also ==
- Edubuntu
