= XForms (toolkit) =

GUI toolkit for the X Window System

XForms toolkit
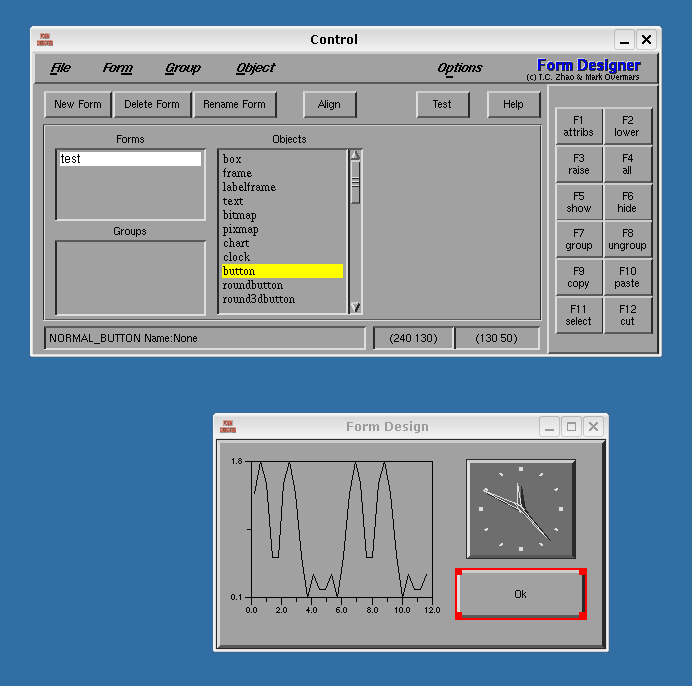
- The XForms Form Designer
- Developer: XForms team
- Stable release: 1.2.4 / June 28, 2014
- Written in: C
- Operating system: Unix-like
- Type: Widget toolkit
- License: GNU LGPL
- Website: xforms-toolkit.org
- Repository: git.savannah.gnu.org/cgit/xforms.git

XForms is a GUI toolkit based on Xlib for the X Window System. It features a rich set of objects, such as buttons, scrollbars, and menus etc. In addition, the library is extensible and new objects can easily be created and added to the library. It also includes the fdesign tool as a graphical user interface builder.

Originally a proprietary toolkit, as of 2002, it was relicensed under the GNU Lesser General Public License v2.1, making XForms free software.

XForms was based on the Forms Library by Mark Overmars, converted from IRIS GL (a precursor to OpenGL that also included calls to create windows and manage events) to X11. A similar conversion was used to make the first versions of FLTK, so all these toolkits are distantly related.

The toolkit was originally used by the Xfce desktop environment for the first two major versions of Xfce. The reason Xfce founder Olivier Fourdan moved from XForms to GTK 1 in 1999 and then to GTK 2 in 2003 was because XForms' original proprietary license prevented Xfce from being included in Linux distros such as Debian and Red Hat Linux before the Xfce 3 rewrite in GTK.
