= Mousepad (software) =

Text editing software

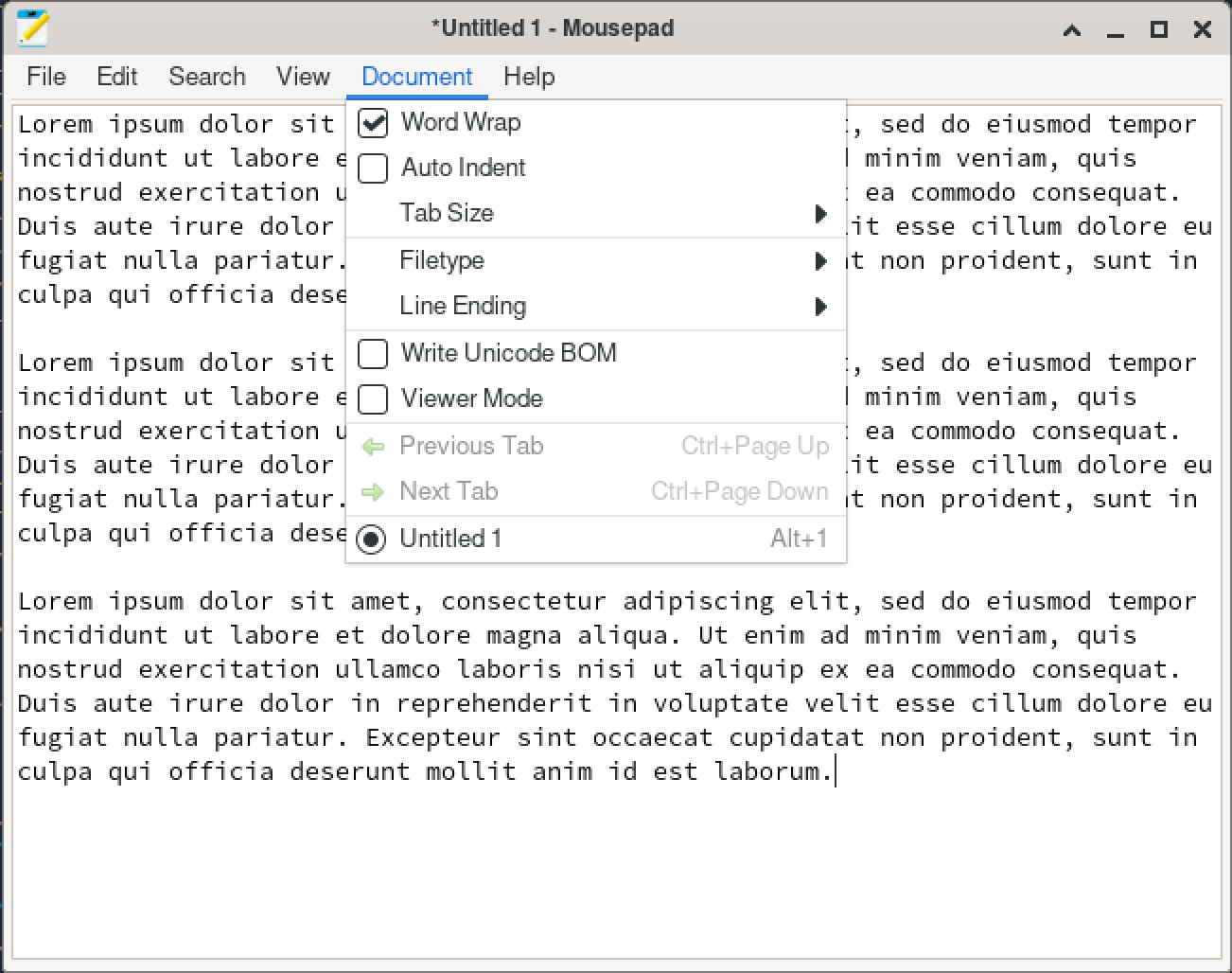
- Original authors: Erik Harrison, Benedikt Meurer, Tarot Osuji
- Developers: Erik Harrison, Nick Schermer, Benedikt Meurer, Matthew Brush, Gaël Bonithon
- Initial release: April 17, 2006; 20 years ago
- Stable release: 0.7.0 / 2 March 2026; 3 months ago
- Written in: GTK
- Operating system: Unix-like
- Platform: x86 64, aarch64, ppc64, i686, ARMhf
- Included with: Xfce
- Predecessor: Leafpad
- Size: 436.2 kB
- Type: Text editor
- License: GPL-2.0-or-later
- Website: docs.xfce.org/apps/mousepad/
- Repository: gitlab.xfce.org/apps/mousepad

Mousepad is a graphical text editor written for Xfce, a Linux desktop environment. The program has a small footprint, similar to Leafpad, but has additional features such as plugins, search history and automatic reloading. The name Mousepad is derived from the mouse in Xfce's logo.

Mousepad was originally written as a fork of an existing text editor, Leafpad, to improve support for printing. It was rewritten in December 2012 with version 0.3.0, which replaced the original code with a complete rewrite.

Though written for Linux, Mousepad has been ported to FreeBSD and is also available for macOS via MacPorts, and Microsoft Windows via Cygwin. It is the default text editor for Linux distributions that use Xfce, such as Xubuntu. Kali Linux uses Mousepad as its default text editor, but modifies the code to add a newline at the end of files so that they are POSIX-compliant and do not merge when printing multiple files back-to-back.

== Features ==
In addition to plugin support, Mousepad has features including tabs, copy and paste, Undo/Redo, drag and drop, keyboard shortcuts, printing, UTF-8 support, line numbers, searching capabilities (with a replace option), font selection, word wrap, automatic and multi-line indent, and both auto character coding detection and manual codeset options.

== Dependencies ==
Compiling Mousepad requires gtksourceview4-4.8.3, which is a library for GTK+ text and visuals, and is used for installing themes. DConf-0.40.0, a dconf package, and dbus-glib-0.112, a GLib tool to interface with D-Bus, are both optional dependencies, along with gspell, a spell-checker, and libxfce4ui, which may be used to display a widget in the XFCE desktop environment.
