= UberStudent =

Open-source computer operating system

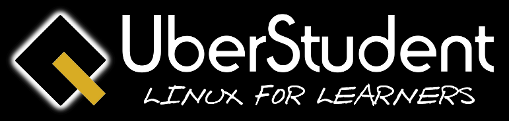

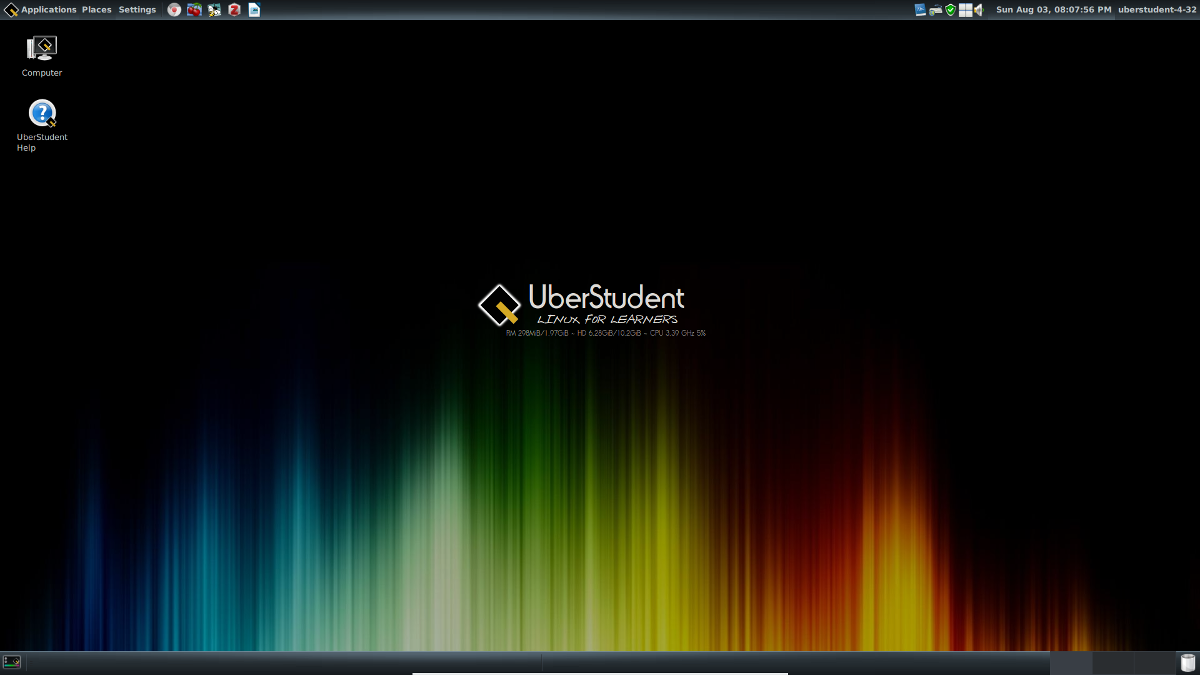
- UberStudent – Linux for Learners
- Developer: UberStudent EdTech and community contributors
- OS family: Linux (Unix-like)
- Working state: Long-Term Stable Release 4.1; no longer actively developed and supported
- Source model: Open source with minor closed source additions
- Latest release: 4.3 / December 30, 2015; 10 years ago
- Marketing target: Higher education; Secondary education; Researchers; Knowledge workers; Lifelong learners
- Kernel type: Monolithic
- Default user interface: XFCE and LXDE Editions
- License: Mainly the GNU GPL; a few other free software licences; minor additions of officially licensed proprietary software
- Official website: www.uberstudent.org

UberStudent was a free and open-source computer operating system and collection of programs aimed toward higher education and secondary students and their teachers and schools. By the time of its 4.1 release, it ranked as the fifth-most popular Linux distribution in the world, according to DistroWatch, and had been adopted by a variety of education centers around the world.

The developer of the platform, U.S. educator and technologist Stephen Ewen, announced on November 24, 2023, that he had no further plans to develop the platform. While thanking past users he stated, "We hope the project continues to be a great example of a very well developed Linux distro for education!" Ewen made this announcement amid a long family health crisis.

Dubbing itself "Linux for Learners", UberStudent described itself as "a cohesive academic success curriculum integrated into an installable, easy-to-use, and full-featured learning platform" aimed at increasing overall student learning, academic computer literacy, and lifelong computer fluency. Its additional aim was to increase the adoption of free and open-source computing platforms, like itself, within higher education and secondary schools. The platform was designed around what Ewen called a "core academic skills approach to student success" which he explained as "the research and writing, reading, studying, and self-management skills that are essential to all students regardless of their academic major."

UberStudent's last release was 4.3, dubbed Heraclitus. The distribution used its own dedicated software repository. It could be run from a live CD, USB flash drive, or installed onto a computer's hard drive from either of those mediums.

Support for the last published version, UberStudent 4.3, based on Ubuntu 14.04, ended in May 2019. According to Ewen, the project at the time had been placed on hold, not discontinued or abandoned, because of a serious family health crisis. He ultimately decided to stop development of UberStudent.

== Origin and design ==
UberStudent was founded and led by developer Stephen Ewen, a U.S.-based educator who specializes in post-secondary literacy instruction, academic success strategies, and educational technology. He began UberStudent, he said, as "a way to place a set of smart and dedicated computing tools, and just the right amount of support, into the hands of students, whether currently within higher education or preparing for it in secondary school." His stated goal through UberStudent was for students to "learn to really excel at the core skills and habits they need to become everything they can academically be, and on into professional life." Ewen stated that UberStudent was, in part, inspired by his own experiences achieving top academic performance in higher education after obtaining a General Educational Development diploma while a young adult.

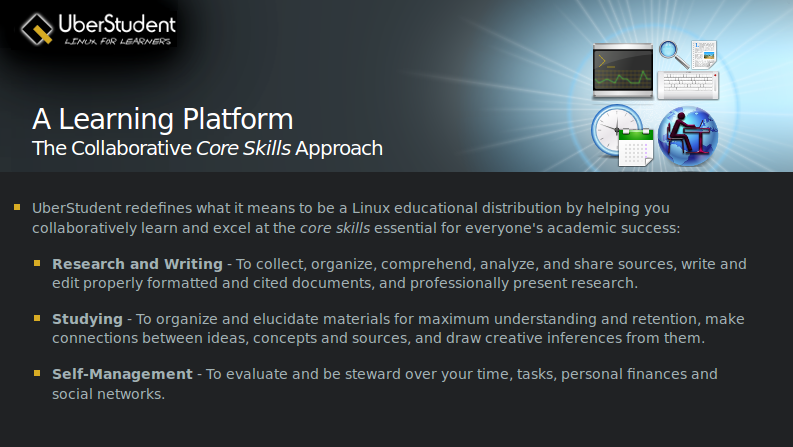
UberStudent's core academic skills approach

Ewen described UberStudent's overarching design philosophy as one that provided a "unified system for learning, doing, and teaching academic success". Within this, he has said that UberStudent took what he called a "core academic skills" approach, which he delineated as "the skills in research and writing, studying, and self-management required of students across all academic majors". He stated that UberStudent could be "easily extended" for specific majors via additional software. Ewen additionally asserted that, in part due to UberStudent's open source and cross-platform nature, and its Unix-like base, it was geared to produce "computer fluency" among its users as a "more or less natural outcome".

Ewen has argued that academic institutions can increase both their student learning outcomes and economic efficiency by more broadly adopting open source application and system software for everyday student academic computing needs. He has additionally argued for academic institutions to increase their involvement in developing open source tools, such as UberStudent, citing successes such as the bibliographic manager Zotero by George Mason University, which was included among UberStudent's set of core academic programs.

== Reception ==
UberStudent was described by reviewers as "highly in tune with student needs," "loaded with student-friendly tools and customizations," "perfect for the higher education environment," succeeding at its aims "with aplomb, elegance, and power," "a smart pick for getting your actual schoolwork done," and "fantastic and delicious." It received a glowing review in The Chronicle of Higher Education which cited UberStudent's completeness for doing core academic work, user-friendliness, and free and open-source nature.

Sixty days after UberStudent's official 15 July 2010 release of UberStudent 1.0 Cicero Full Edition, its first non-beta, DistroWatch ranked it the most popular Linux distribution for education worldwide and the 32nd most popular overall out of the 316 varied distributions tracked by the organization. Weeks after the 4.1 release, it ranked as the fifth-most popular Linux distribution in the world.

== System, software, reviews ==
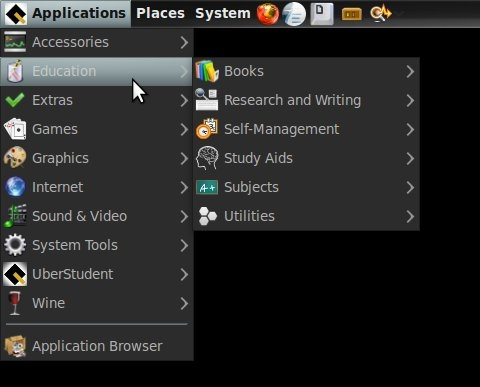
The first level of the Education menu in UberStudent 1.0 Cicero Full Edition

Nearly all of UberStudent's software was free and open-source and its core programs cross-platform so its adopters could avoid vendor lock-in, whether with Windows, Mac OS X, or Linux. The tech review site Dedoimedo reviewed UberStudent as containing a "superb" collection of "smartly selected" programs, "probably the best when it comes to serious work", with each "stitched into the fabric of the operating system". Tech columnist Jack Wallen said UberStudent "contains so many education-specific tools you will be spending your first days with it just marveling at what the developers have packed into one single operating system."

UberStudent's core programs for academic work were clustered within an applications menu entry, Education, where they were organized by sub-categories, including for Reading, Research and Writing, Self-Management, Study Aids, Subjects, and Utilities, which themselves have sub-categories. In addition to its academic-specific application set, reviewers have noted UberStudent's inclusion of templates for academic work and "tons" of on-board how-to guides as "welcome additions" that are "often missing" from other operating systems. UberStudent also contained a full range of student-oriented programs in the Multimedia, Games, Graphics, Internet, and several other categories. Within a separate menu, it contained select cloud computing applications that have been described as containing additions "you don't often see elsewhere".

Within its stated intent to couple user-friendliness with security and stability, UberStudent production releases were based on Xubuntu Long Term Stable releases, which stems from the Debian branch of Linux. UberStudent included numerous unique applications developed by Ewen, plus its own Update Manager using the deb file format to manage and update the platform.

== Editions ==
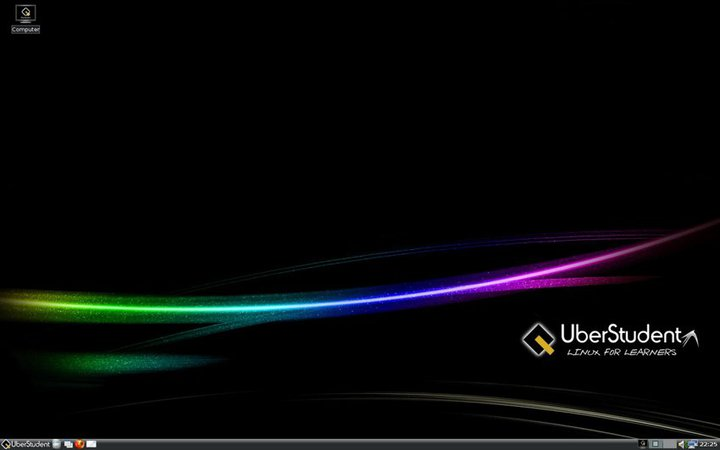
The default desktop of UberStudent 1.0 Cicero Lightweight Edition

UberStudent main editions were distributed as a DVD image or pre-made disc. The full edition featured the Xfce desktop environment, and the Light Edition the LXDE desktop environment. The LXDE lightweight edition was greatly scaled down and intended solely "to re-invigorate low-specification or older computers" and fit on a single CD.

=== Criticisms of competing desktop environments ===
Amid his decision to feature Xfce in UberStudent full editions, Ewen stated that "UberStudent must prefer stability, dependability, and traditional usability over the novel when it comes to such a major thing as the basic desktop environments it uses; and it will."

==== GNOME 3, Ubuntu Unity ====
During UberStudent's 2.0 release cycle, Ewen criticized the designs of both the Ubuntu Unity and GNOME 3 Shell Linux desktop environments as hindrances to student academic computing productivity. In a 2011 April Fools' Day satire, he announced an "UberStudent Dumbed Down Edition" featuring the GNOME 3 Shell. Pointing to what he called "the enforced helplessness" leading to "learned helplessness" that he says the GNOME 3 developers designed into their new desktop environment, he stated that the intent behind the spoof UberStudent edition was to "obscure what is not obvious and easy so it can be continually avoided" by students and thus never learned. In a May 2011 interview, Ewen expanded his criticisms of Unity and GNOME 3 by citing specific usability issues and stated that UberStudent had no plans to adopt either Unity or the GNOME 3 Shell.

==== Cinnamon ====
Amid UberStudent's 3.0 release cycle, Ewen criticized the Cinnamon desktop environment, developed by Linux Mint, pointing out what he called "major shortcomings" in Cinnamon, which he stipulated as its failure to honor certain fundamental freedesktop.org standards. Ewen stated that, "While the desktop environment holds promise, Cinnamon as of its May 2013 version 1.8 release is only beta-quality software." As such, he characterized Cinnamon as "not at all yet suited for a serious and stable workstation.

== Releases and naming ==
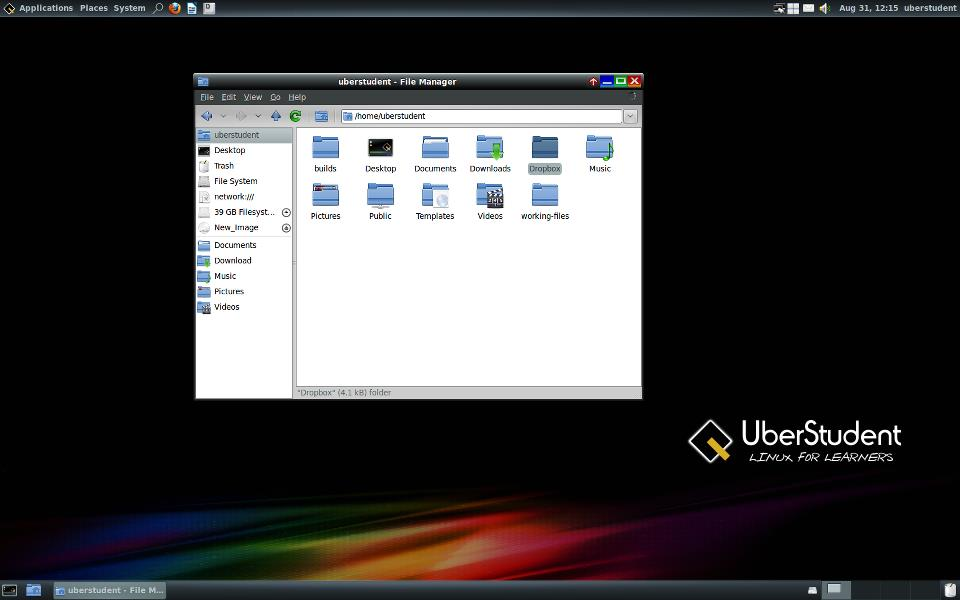
UberStudent 2.0 pre-release screenshot.

According to Ewen, "UberStudent dubbed each of its major releases after a famous historical thinker," a practice he described as "only fitting" in light of UberStudent's educational mission. The thinkers were Greek and Roman. UberStudent's version 0.9, the first beta, was released on 15 January 2010 and named after Thales. Version 1.0, released on 15 July 2010, was named after Cicero. 1.0 also had a brief pre-release edition, once inadvertently reviewed as the release edition. UberStudent 1.0 Cicero Lightweight Edition was released on 4 September 2010 and inherited the name Cicero from the full edition. UberStudent 2.0 was dubbed "Plato," UberStudent 3.0 was dubbed "Aristotle," and the 4.0 release "Socrates." The last release, 4.3, was dubbed "Heraclitus."

5.0 was in development until Ewen dropped it after a major health crisis impacted his family.

== Future ==
According to Ewen, Uberstudent's lead developer, the platform is officially abandonware, although all past distributions and complete repositories are available on SourceForge.

== See also ==
- List of third-party Ubuntu-based Linux distributions
- Edubuntu
- Edtech
