= SolydXK =

Linux distribution

- Developer: Arjen Balfoort and community members
- OS family: Linux (Unix-like)
- Working state: Active
- Source model: Open source and closed source
- Initial release: 28 February 2013; 13 years ago
- Latest release: 12 / 4 December 2023; 2 years ago
- Marketing target: home users, small businesses and non-profit organizations
- Available in: Multilingual
- Update method: APT, custom UpdateManager, Synaptic
- Package manager: dpkg
- Supported platforms: i386, AMD64, ARM architecture (Raspberry PI2 and PI3)
- Kernel type: Monolithic (Linux)
- Userland: GNU
- Influenced by: Debian Stable and testing
- Default user interface: KDE Plasma 5 (default in SolydK), Xfce (default in SolydX)
- License: Free software, mainly the GNU GPL, and other licenses
- Official website: solydxk.com

SolydXK is a Dutch Linux distribution based on Debian. It aims to be simple to use, providing an environment that is stable, secure, and ideal for small businesses, non-profit organizations and home users.

SolydXK includes proprietary software such as Adobe Flash, Steam and optional closed-source drivers to provide initial multimedia usage and gaming on Linux.

== History ==
SolydXK originated in 2012 as an unofficial version of "Linux Mint Debian edition" (LMDE) using the KDE Plasma 4 desktop.

In November 2012, Linux Mint ceased maintaining both the KDE and Xfce versions of LMDE. SolydXK was started to support these two desktop environments. "SolydX" refers to the Xfce version, while "SolydK" refers to the KDE version. The project name is an amalgam of the two names.

== Features ==
The two core editions for SolydXK, SolydX and SolydK, are officially available in 64-bit Live CDs with installers.

The distribution installs with common software such as Firefox, LibreOffice, XChat/Quassel, Pidgin/Kopete, and GIMP for a variety of common tasks. Both editions also provide Steam and PlayOnLinux installed for gaming, and a driver manager to easily enable the best gaming performance.

SolydXK, originally based on Debian testing, since January 2015 is built on Debian Stable.

There are also Community Editions, not officially tested nor supported by the SolydXK team. Examples are the SolydXK Enthusiast's Edition - versions of SolydX and SolydK that follow Debian testing, the 32-bit community editions and the version for Raspberry Pi 3.

== Version history ==
Version	Date	Kernel version
201302	28.02.2013	—N/a
201306	18.06.2013	—N/a
201308	23.08.2013	—N/a
201309	09.2013	—N/a
201311	26.11.2013	3.10.11
201401	25.01.2014	—N/a
201405	03.05.2014	—N/a
201407	31.07.2014	—N/a
201411	11.2014	3.16.7
201501	31.01.2015	—N/a
201506	09.06.2015	—N/a
201512	25.12.2015	—N/a
201606	27.06.2016	3.16.7
201701	01.2017	3.16.39
9	16.07.2017	4.9.30
201709	30.09.2017	—N/a
201801	16.01.2018	4.9.65
201807	02.07.2018	4.9.88
201902	03.03.2019	—N/a
