= Xfce =

Desktop environment

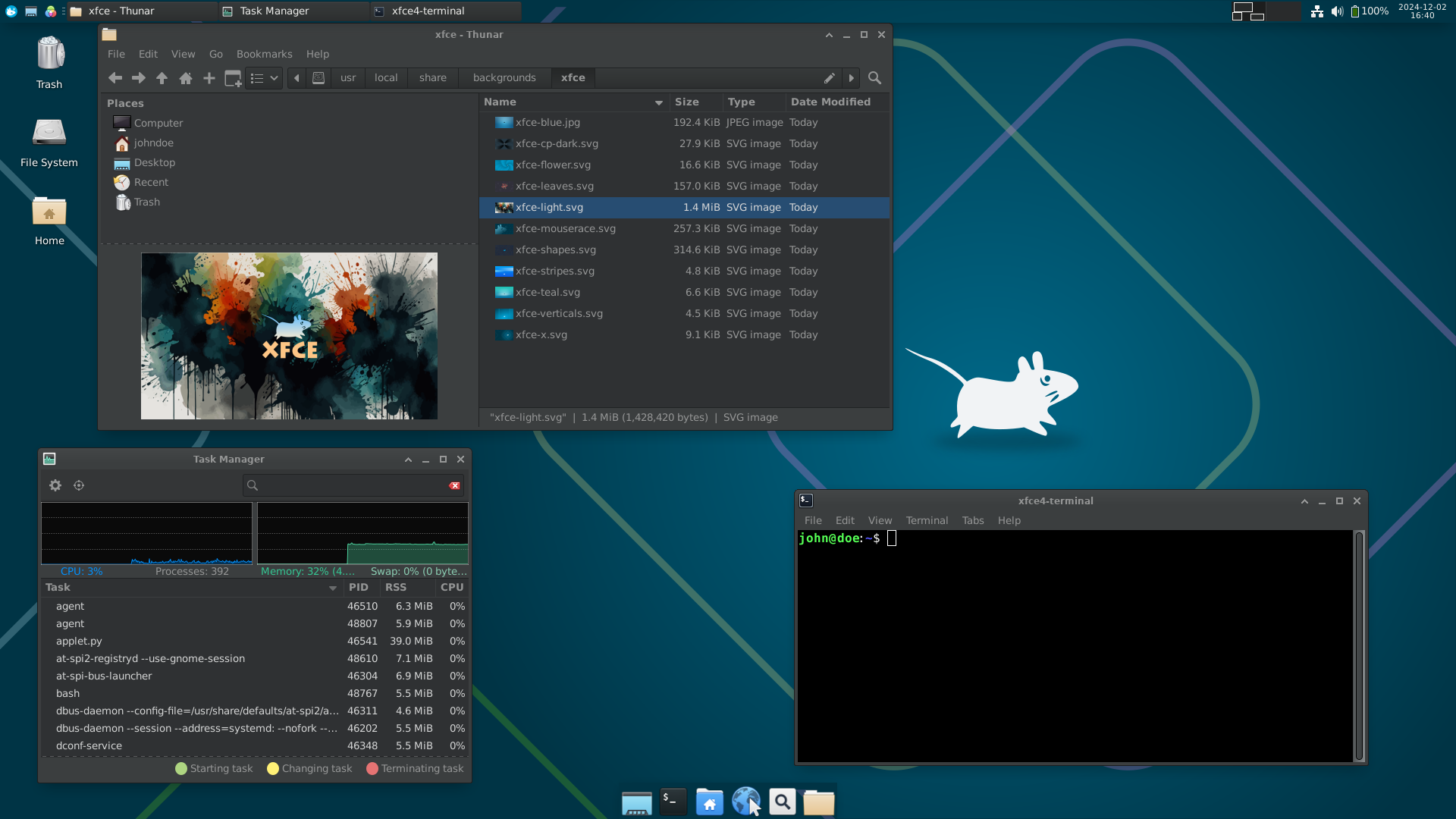
- Xfce 4.20 with Thunar, Xfce Terminal, and Xfce Task Manager on Linux
- Original author: Olivier Fourdan
- Developer: Free software community
- Release: 1997; 29 years ago
- Stable release: 4.20 / 15 December 2024; 22 months ago
- Written in: C (GTK), Rust
- Middleware: X Window System (X.Org), Wayland
- Engine: GTK
- Operating system: Linux, FreeBSD, NetBSD, OpenBSD and GNU/Hurd
- Platform: Unix-like
- Available in: At least 31 languages
- Type: Desktop environment
- License: GPL, LGPL, BSD
- Website: xfce.org
- Repository: gitlab.xfce.org/xfce

Xfce (pronounced as four individual letters, /ɛks ɛf siː iː/) is a free and open-source desktop environment for Linux and other Unix-like operating systems.

Xfce aims to be fast and lightweight while still visually appealing and easy to use. The desktop environment is designed to embody the traditional Unix philosophy of modularity and re-usability, as well as adherence to standards; specifically, those defined at freedesktop.org.

== Features ==
=== User experience ===
Xfce is a highly modular desktop environment, with many software repositories separating its components into multiple packages. The built-in settings app offers options to customize the GTK theme, the system icons, the cursor, the window manager and more. Additionally, Xfce provides a fully GUI-based system for modifying the desktop's status bar and system tray.

=== Performance ===
Xfce is a lightweight desktop environment which omits many of the visually 'appealing' features (such as animations) present in other desktop environments such as KDE Plasma and GNOME. These omissions allow Xfce to run much more smoothly on low-end personal computers.

== History ==
Olivier Fourdan started the Xfce project in late 1996 as a Linux version of the Common Desktop Environment (CDE), a Unix desktop environment that was initially proprietary and later released as free software.

The name was originally written as XFce, as an abbreviation of XForms Common Environment, which referred to the XForms library. However, Xfce has been transformed and is now based entirely on the GTK toolkit. The name was kept, now with lowercase f, but the abbreviation no longer means anything.

The first Xfce release was in early 1997. However, over time, Xfce diverged from CDE and now stands on its own.

The name Xfce originally stood for “XForms Common Environment”, but since then Xfce has been rewritten twice and doesn't use the XForms toolkit anymore. The name survived, but it is no longer capitalized as “XFCE” and is no longer an abbreviation for anything (although suggestions have been made, such as “X Freakin' Cool Environment”).

— Frequently Asked Questions, Xfce Wiki

The Slackware Linux distribution has nicknamed Xfce the "Cholesterol Free Desktop Environment", a loose interpretation of the initialism.

=== Mascot ===
Per the FAQ, the logo of Xfce is "a mouse, obviously, for all kinds of reasons like world domination and monsters and such." In the SuperTuxKart game, in which various open source mascots race against each other, the mouse is said to be a female named "Xue". The mascot's original design was created by Bonnie Green.

=== Early versions ===
Xfce 1

Xfce began as a simple project created with XForms. Olivier Fourdan released the program, which was just a simple taskbar, on SunSITE.

Fourdan continued developing the project and in 1998, Xfce 2 was released with the first version of Xfce's window manager, Xfwm. He requested the project be included in Red Hat Linux, but it was refused due to its XForms basis. Red Hat accepted only open-source software released under a GPL- or BSD-compatible license, whereas, at the time, XForms was closed-source and free only for personal use. For the same reason, Xfce was not in Debian before version 3, and Xfce 2 was distributed only in Debian's contrib repository.

In March 1999, Fourdan began a complete rewrite of the project based on GTK, a non-proprietary toolkit then rising in popularity. The result was Xfce 3.0, licensed under the GPL. As well as being based completely on free software, it gained GTK drag-and-drop support, native language support, and improved configurability. Xfce was uploaded to SourceForge.net in February 2001, starting with version 3.8.1.

=== Xfce 4.0 - 4.10 ===
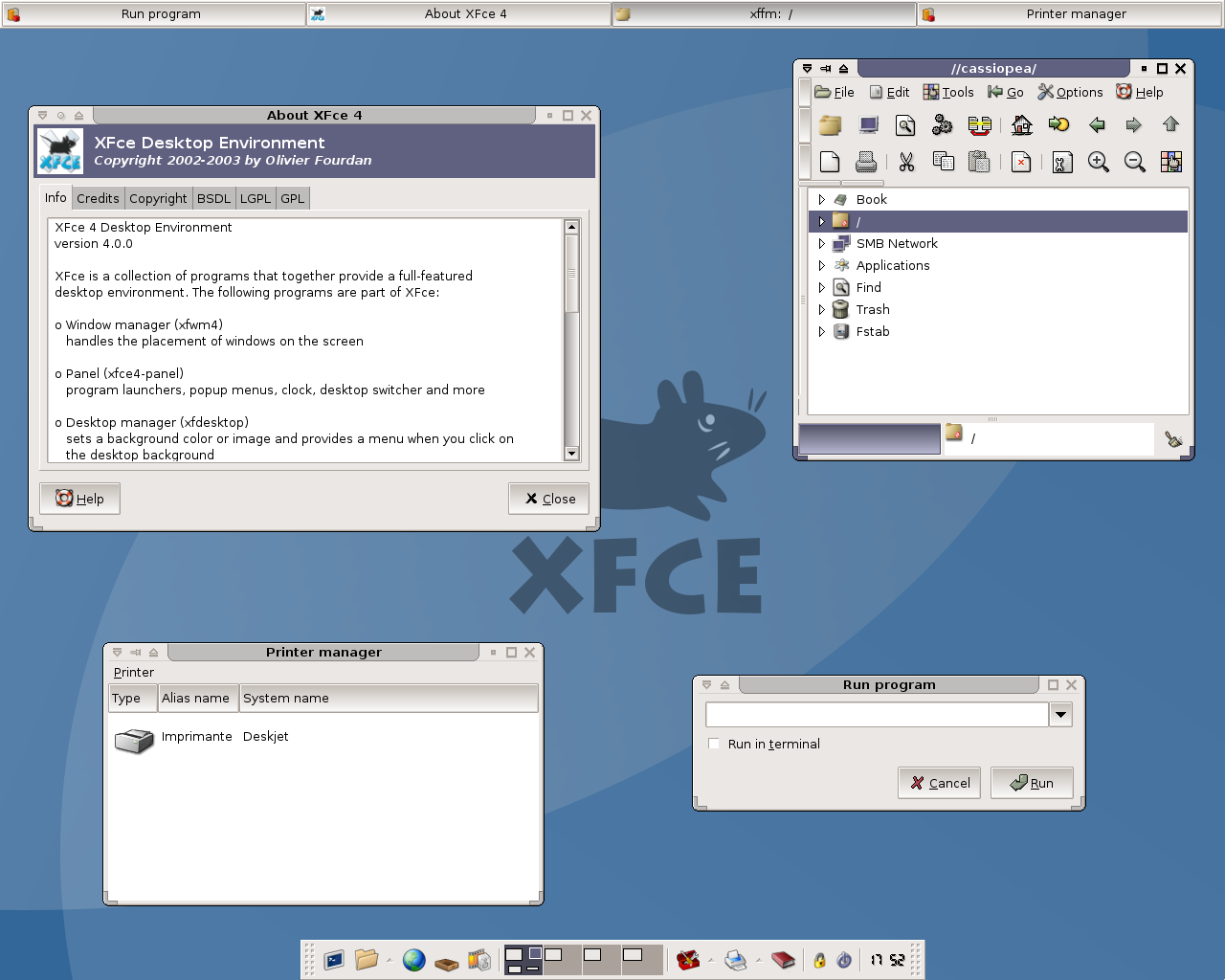
Xfce 4.0.0

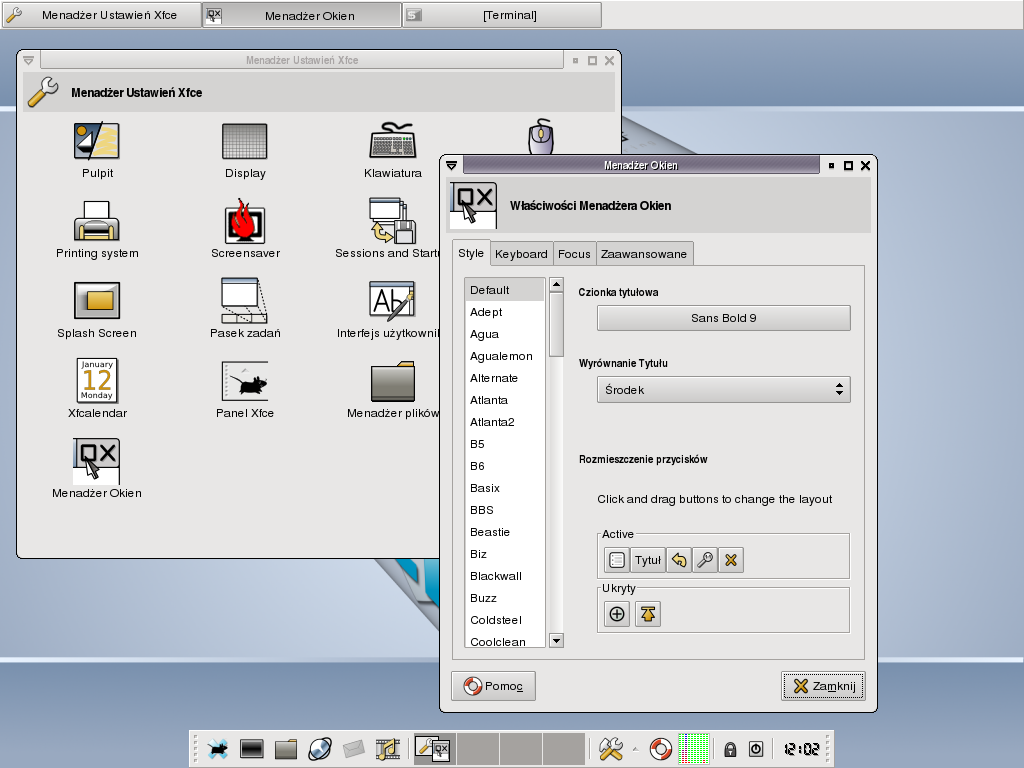
Xfce 4.2.2

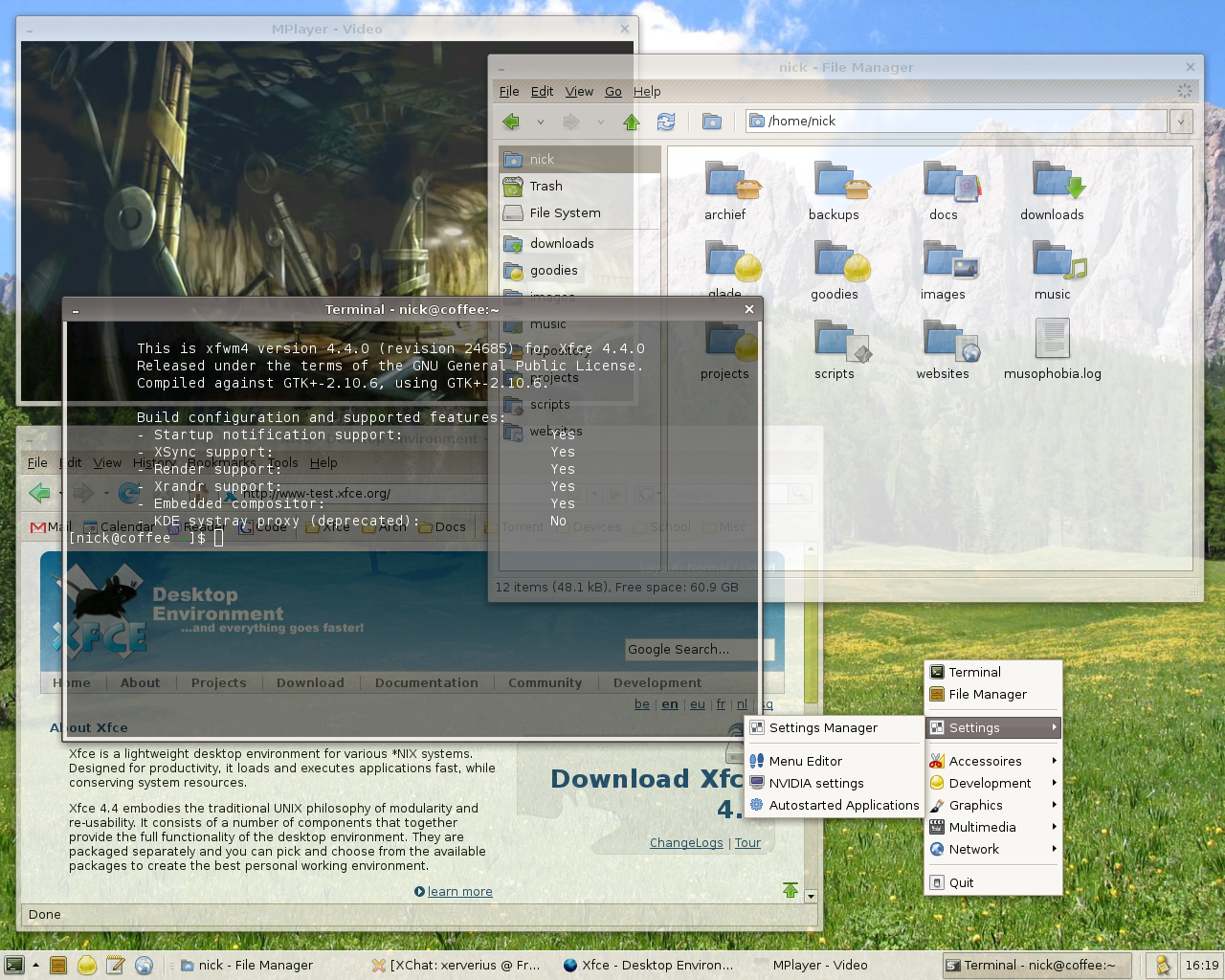
An Xfce 4.4 desktop showcasing various Xfwm effects: drop shadows behind windows, alpha-blended windows and panel

In version 4.0.0, released 25 September 2003, Xfce was upgraded to use the GTK 2 libraries.

Changes in 4.2.0, released 16 January 2005, included a compositing manager for Xfwm which added built-in support for transparency and drop shadows, as well as a new default SVG icon set.

In January 2007, Xfce 4.4.0 was released. This included the Thunar file manager, a replacement for Xffm. Support for desktop icons was added. Also, various improvements were made to the panel to prevent buggy plugins from crashing the whole panel, as well as support for multiple panels; previous versions of Xfce could only support one panel in addition to Xftaskbar4 and Xfce4-iconbox. These tools were made available as panel plugins in this version.

In February 2009, Xfce 4.6.0 was released. This version had a new configuration backend, a new settings manager and a new sound mixer, as well as several significant improvements to the session manager and the rest of Xfce's core components.

In January 2011, Xfce 4.8.0 was released. This version included changes such as the replacement of ThunarVFS and HAL with GIO, udev, ConsoleKit and PolicyKit, and new utilities for browsing remote network shares using several protocols including SFTP, SMB, and FTP. Window clutter was reduced by merging all Thunar file progress dialog boxes into a single dialog. The panel application was also rewritten for better positioning, transparency, and item and launcher management. 4.8 also introduced a new menu plugin to view directories. The 4.8 plugin framework remains compatible with 4.6 plugins. The display configuration dialog in 4.8 supports RandR 1.2, detecting screens automatically and allowing users to pick their preferred display resolution, refresh rate, and display rotation. Multiple displays can be configured to either work in clone mode, or be placed next to each other. Keyboard selection was revamped to be easier and more user-friendly. Also, the manual settings editor was updated to be more functional.

The 4.8 development cycle was the first to use the new release strategy formed after the "Xfce Release and Development Model" developed at the Ubuntu Desktop Summit in May 2009. A new web application was employed to make release management easier, and a dedicated Transifex server was set up for Xfce translators. The project's server and mirroring infrastructure was also upgraded, partly to cope with anticipated demand following the release announcement for 4.8.

Xfce 4.10, released 28 April 2012, introduced a vertical display mode for the panel and moved much of the documentation to an online wiki. The main focus of this release was on improving the user experience.

=== Modern Xfce ===
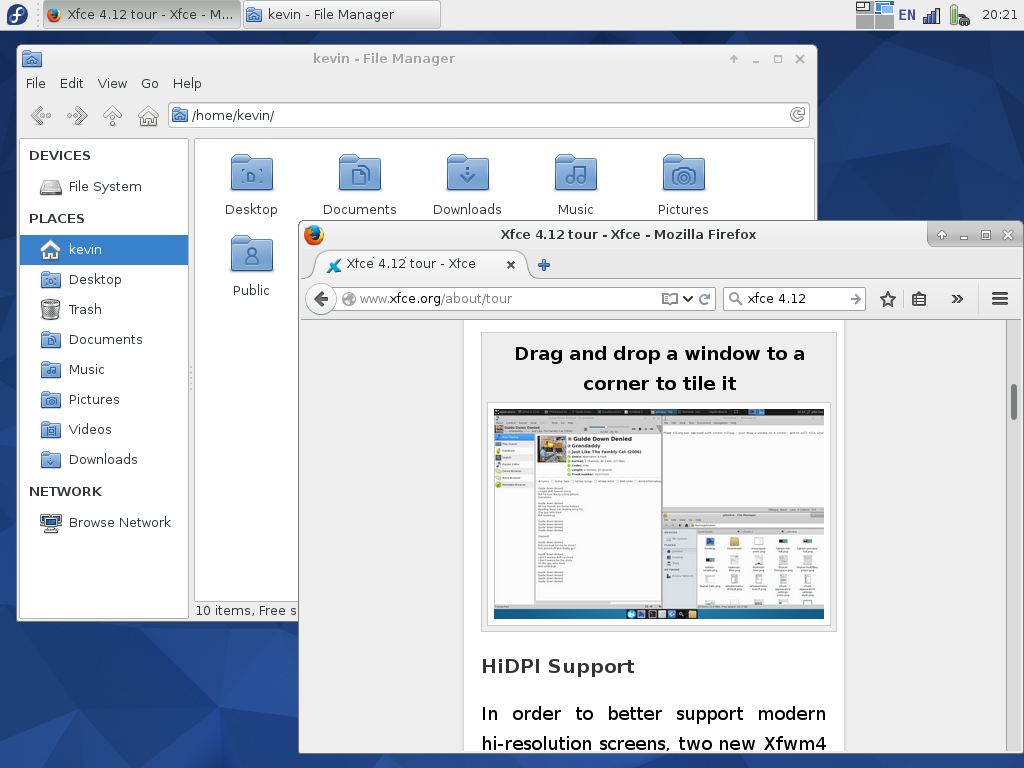
An Xfce 4.12 example desktop running on Fedora 22; notice the file manager has been rewritten in GTK 3.

Xfce 4.12 was released on 28 February 2015, two years and ten months later, contrary to mass Internet speculation about the project being "dead". The target of 4.12 was to improve user experience and take advantage of technologies introduced in the interim. New window manager features include an Alt+Tab dialog, and smart multi-monitor handling. Also, a new power management plugin for the panel's notification area was introduced, as well as a re-written text editor and an enhanced file manager. Xfce 4.12 also started the transition to GTK 3 by porting application and supporting plugins and bookmarks. With 4.12, the project reiterated its commitment to Unix-like platforms other than Linux by featuring OpenBSD screenshots.

Xfce 4.13 is the development release during the transition of porting components to be fully GTK3-compatible, including xfce-panel and xfce-settings.

The planned release of Xfce 4.14 was announced in April 2016 and was officially released on 12 August 2019. The main goals of the release included porting the remaining core components from GTK 2 to GTK 3; replacing the dependency on dbus-glib with GDBus, GNOME's implementation of the D-Bus specification; and removing deprecated widgets. Major features were postponed for a later 4.16 release. The minimum GTK 3 version was bumped from 3.14 to 3.22.

Xfce 4.16 was released on 22 December 2020. Some notable changes in this release include new icons with a more consistent color palette; improved interfaces for changing system settings; various panel improvements like animations for hiding, a new notification plugin with support for both legacy SysTray and modern StatusNotifier items, and better support for dark themes; and more information included in the About dialog.

Xfce 4.18 was released on 15 December 2022. This release mainly focused on new features and improvements to the Thunar file manager including an image preview sidebar, split view, recursive file searching, better mime type handling, per-file color highlighting, undoing up to 10 actions, a recently opened files location, restoring open tabs on startup, and a customizable toolbar. Other changes include a keyboard shortcut editor and merging the date and time plugins.

Xfce 4.20 was released on 15 December 2024. This release mainly focused on restructuring preparing Xfce components for Wayland support. As of this release, almost all Xfce components support Wayland and can be used on Wayland via a compatible compositor such as labwc or Wayfire, as Xfwm 4.20 and Xfdashboard 4.20 do not have complete Wayland support yet. As such, the Wayland session of Xfce 4.20 is considered experimental and only recommended for advanced users.

== Software components ==
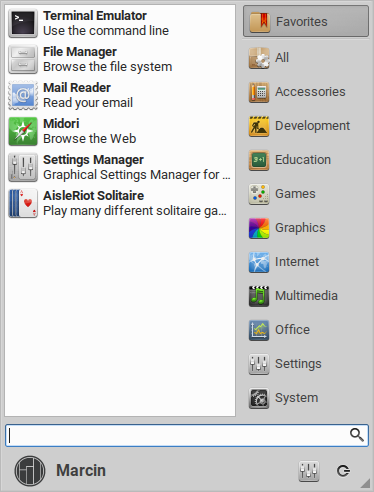
Whisker Menu - an alternate application launcher for Xfce

Applications developed by the Xfce team are based on GTK and self-developed Xfce libraries. Other than Xfce itself, there are third-party programs which use the Xfce libraries.

=== Development framework ===
Xfce provides a development framework which contains the following components:

- exo, an application library for the Xfce desktop environment
- garcon, a Freedesktop.org compliant menu library
- libxfce4ui, a widgets library for the Xfce desktop environment
- libxfce4util, an extension library for Xfce

One of the services provided to applications by the framework is a red banner across the top of the window when the application is running with root privileges, warning the user that they could damage system files.

=== Xfce Panel ===
Xfce Panel is a highly configurable taskbar, with a variety of plug-ins to choose from.

Many aspects of the panel and its plug-ins can be configured easily through graphical dialogs, but also by GTK style properties and hidden Xfconf settings.

=== Xfce Terminal ===
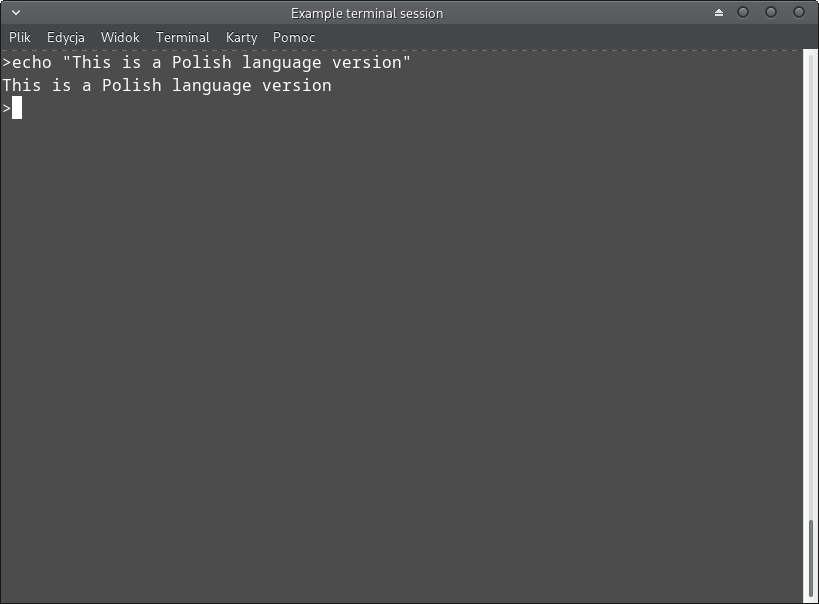
XFCE terminal emulator

A terminal emulator is provided as part of the Xfce project, but it can be used in other X Window System environments as well. It supports tabs, customizable key bindings, colors, and window sizes. It was designed to replace GNOME Terminal, which depends on the GNOME libraries. Like GNOME Terminal, though, it is based on the VTE library. Xfce Terminal can be configured to offer a varying background color for each tab. It can also be used as a drop-down terminal emulator, similar to Guake or Tilda.

=== xfwm ===
xfwm is Xfce's window manager, supporting custom themes. Starting with version 4.2, Xfwm integrates its own compositing manager. Xfwm is the default window manager for the LXQt desktop environment in Linux distributions like Debian. xfwm uses X11.

xfwl4 is Xfce's Wayland compositor that has been in development since January 2026. It is written in Rust.

=== Catfish ===
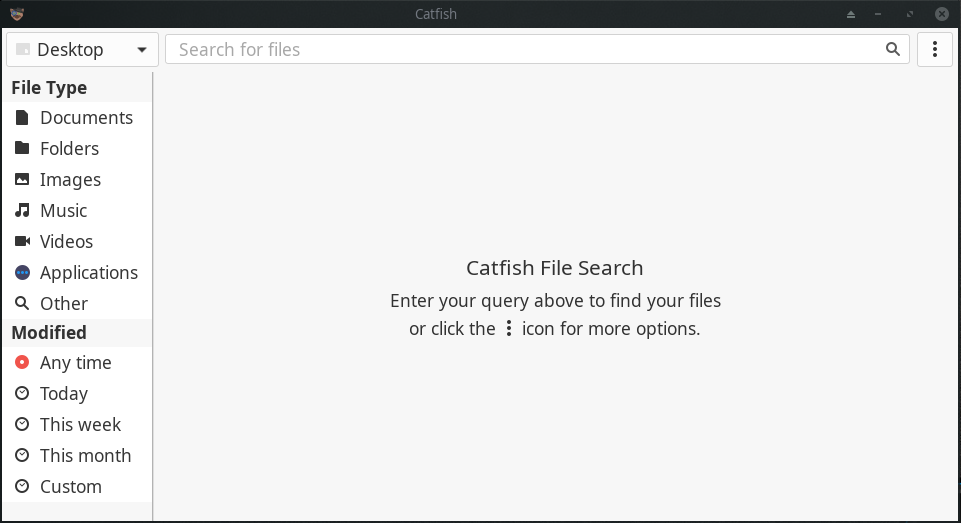
Catfish search tool

A file searching tool, able to perform in-name and in-text matching, as well searching by file type and last modified time. It is also capable of performing indexing by using an mlocate database.

=== Thunar ===
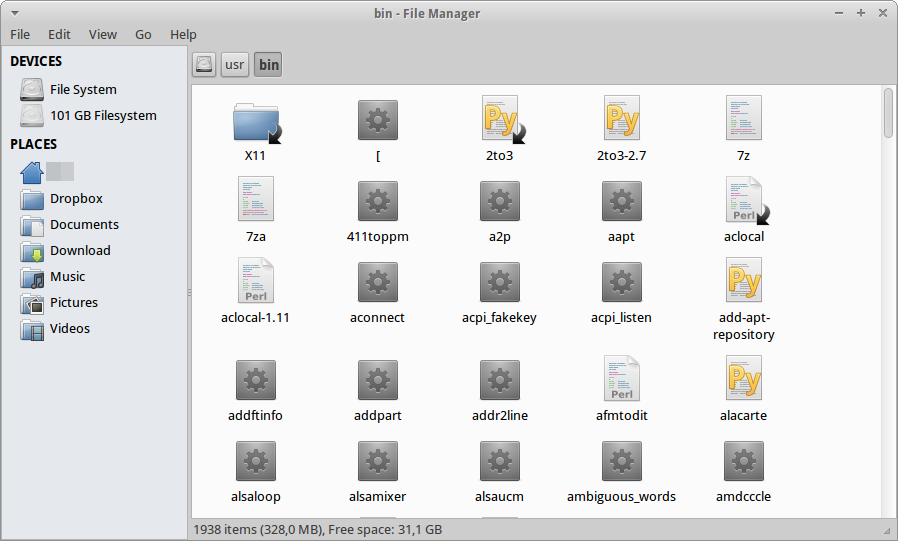
Thunar file manager

Thunar is the default file manager for Xfce, replacing Xffm. It resembles GNOME's Nautilus, and is designed for speed and a low memory footprint, as well as being highly customizable through plugins. Xfce also has a lightweight archive manager called Xarchiver, but this is not part of the core Xfce 4.4.0. More recently, Squeeze has been started as an archive manager designed to integrate better into the Xfce desktop, and though no releases have been made since 2008, the git repository of squeeze has been active and this version is more feature-rich than the last stable release.

=== Orage ===
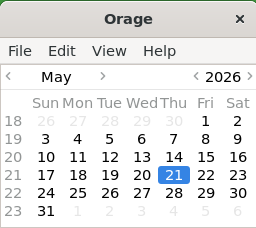
Orage calendar

Starting with version 4.4, Xfcalendar was renamed to Orage (French for "thunderstorm") and several features were added. Orage has alarms and uses the iCalendar format, making it compatible with many other calendar applications, e.g. vdirsyncer to sync via CalDAV. It also includes a panel clock plugin and an international clock application capable of simultaneously showing clocks from several different time zones. With Xfce 4.16, and the dropping of GTK2 support for panel plugins, orage was replaced with DateTime plugin.

=== Mousepad ===
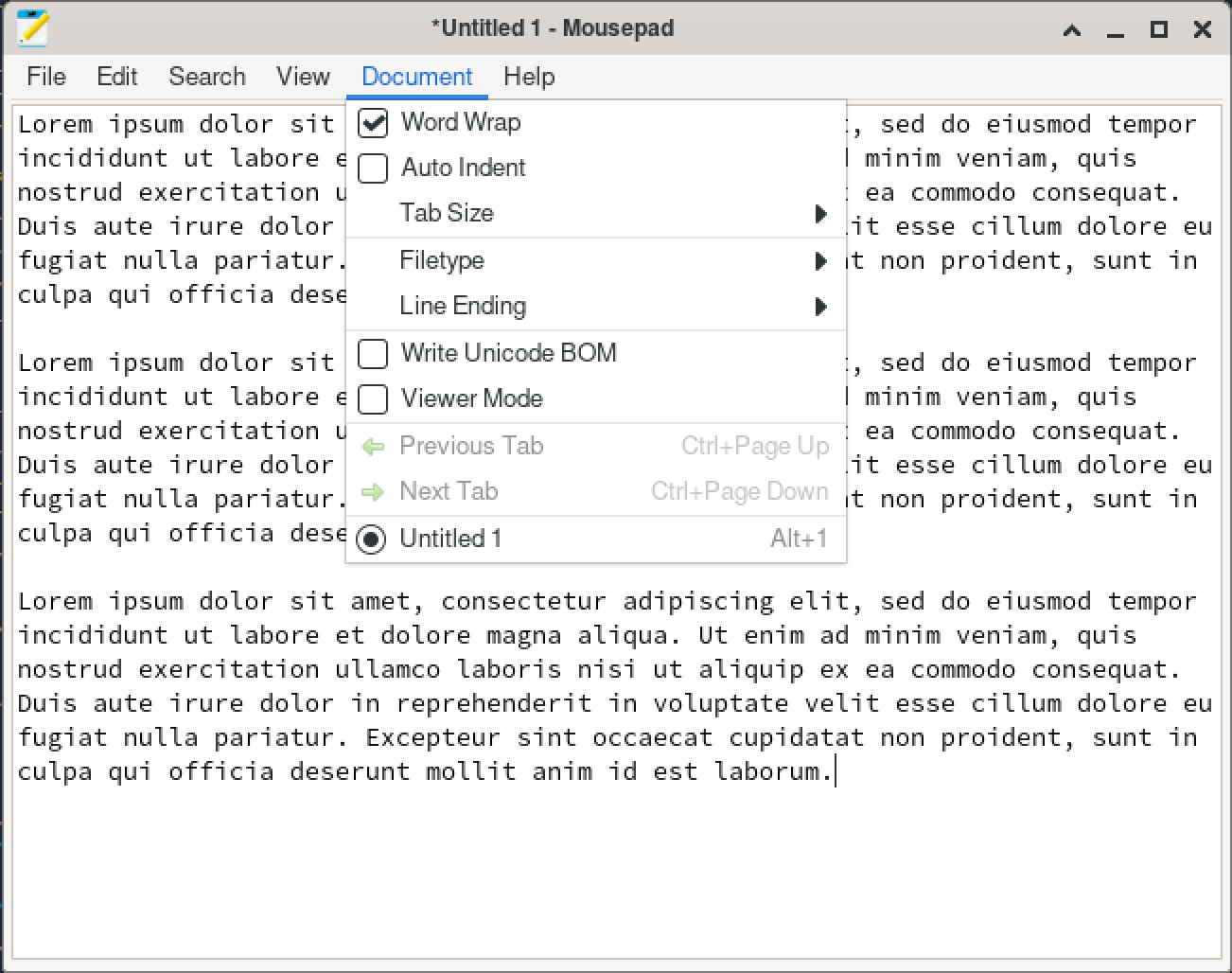
Mousepad text editor

Mousepad is the default text editor for Xfce in some Linux distributions, including Xubuntu. Mousepad aims to be an easy-to-use and fast editor, meant for quickly editing text files, not a software development environment or an editor with a large plugin ecosystem. It does offer tabbed files, syntax highlighting, parentheses matching and indentation features commonly found in software editors. It closely follows the GTK-system release cycle. It originated as a fork of Leafpad, was developed by Erik Harrison and Nick Schermer, but has since been rewritten from scratch.

=== Parole ===
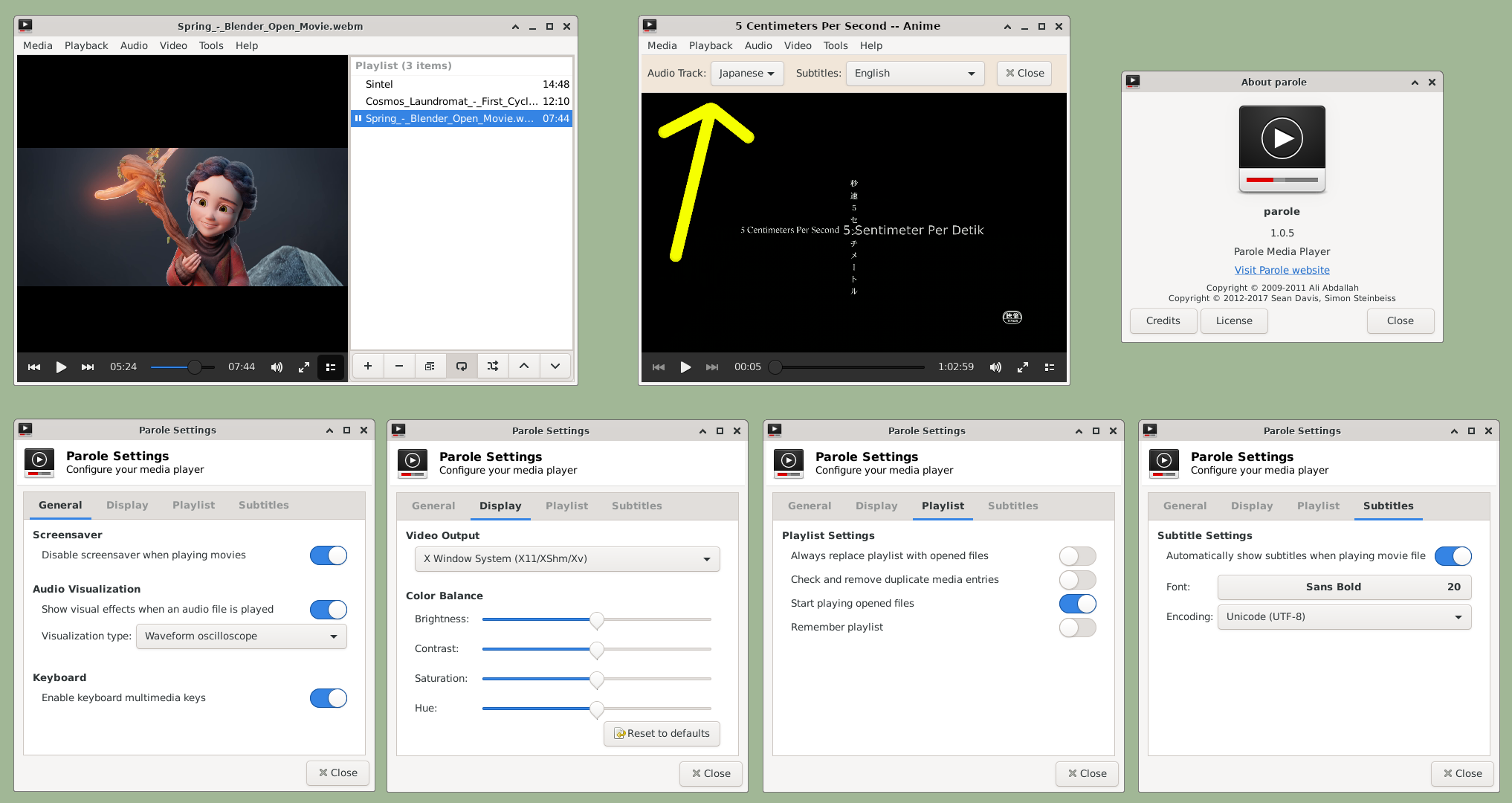
Parole 1.0.5 (2019–11)

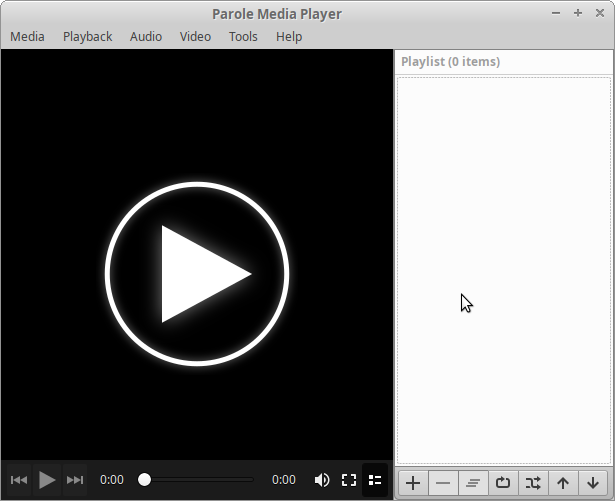
Parole 1.0.5

Parole is a simple media player based on the GStreamer framework. It is designed with simplicity, speed and resource usage in mind, and is part of the Xfce Goodies and uses at least three libraries from the Xfce project (libxfce4ui, libxfce4util, and libxfconf).

It is similar to GNOME Videos, but it has some advantages and disadvantages compared to it:

Advantages

- It has (X11/XShm/Xv) video output that provides a much higher frame rate than Clutter-based video output of GNOME Videos which relies upon OpenGL or OpenGL ES for rendering
- Traditional text-based playlist on the main window for both audio and video files which provides an easy and fast switch between the files and shows their time
- Audio visualization
- Showing a banner upon the videos that have multiple audio or subtitle files

Disadvantages

- Lacks a mechanism to speed up or slow down the media playback
- Lacks many advanced features of GNOME Videos
- As of version 1.0.5 (2019–11) it cannot run under Wayland

=== Ristretto ===
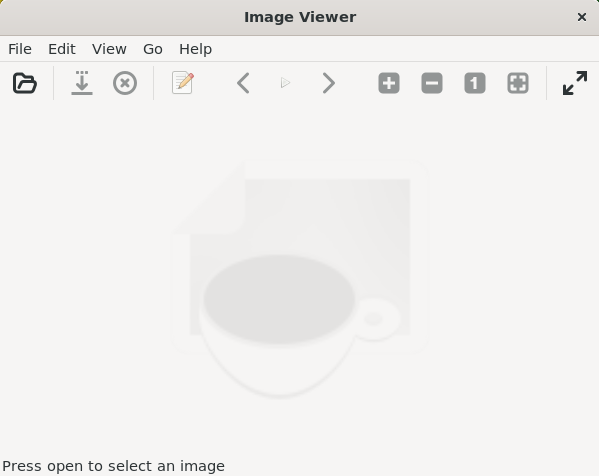
Ristretto image viewer

An image viewer (supporting slideshow mode). Ristretto can operate on folders of images, and display their thumbnails in addition to the active image.

=== Xfburn ===
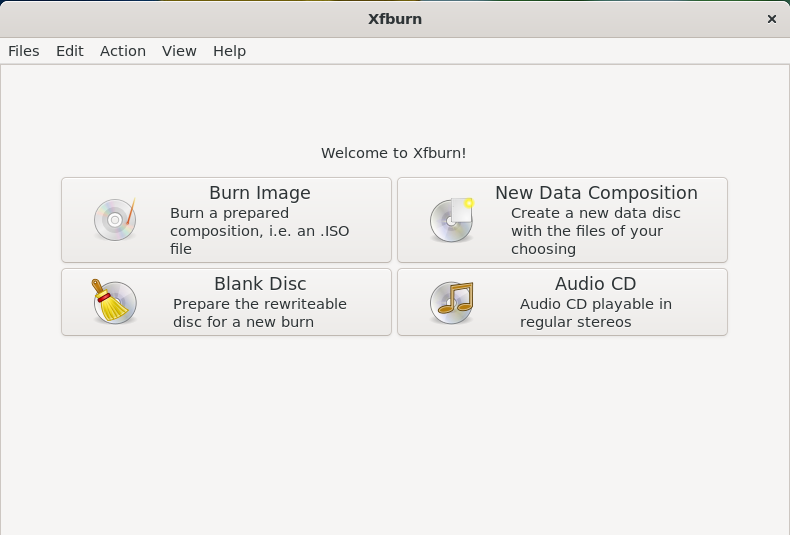
Xfburn disc author

A CD/DVD optical disc authoring software. Starting with the 4.12 release of Xfce, Xfburn is also able to burn Blu-ray discs.

=== Xfce Screensaver ===
A screen saver and session-locking program first packaged with the 4.14 release of Xfce. It uses screensaver themes compatible with Xscreensaver. Although forked from MATE Screensaver, it depends only on Xfce libraries.

=== Table of Xfce 4 components ===
| Components | Descriptions | Notes |
|---|---|---|
| Catfish | Desktop search | |
| Clipman | Clipboard manager | |
| Mousepad | Text editor | |
| Orage | Graphical calendar | With XFCE 4.16 Orage was replaced by new DateTime plugin |
| Parole | A front-end for the GStreamer framework | |
| Thunar | File manager | |
| Xfburn | Optical disc authoring supports CD/DVD/BRD | |
| Xfce4-appfinder | Application finder for Xfce4 | |
| Xfce4-mixer | A volume control plugin for the Xfce Panel and a standalone sound mixer application | Uses GStreamer as a backend |
| xfce4-notifyd | A simple, visually-appealing notification daemon for Xfce that implements the Freedesktop.org Desktop Notifications Specification | |
| Xfce4-Panel | Desktop taskbar | |
| Xfce4-power-manager | PC power management program | |
| Xfce4-session | Xfce4 Session Manager | |
| Xfce Screensaver | Screensaver | |
| Xfce-terminal | Terminal emulator | |
| Xfwm | X window manager | With optional compositing |

== Products and distributions using Xfce ==
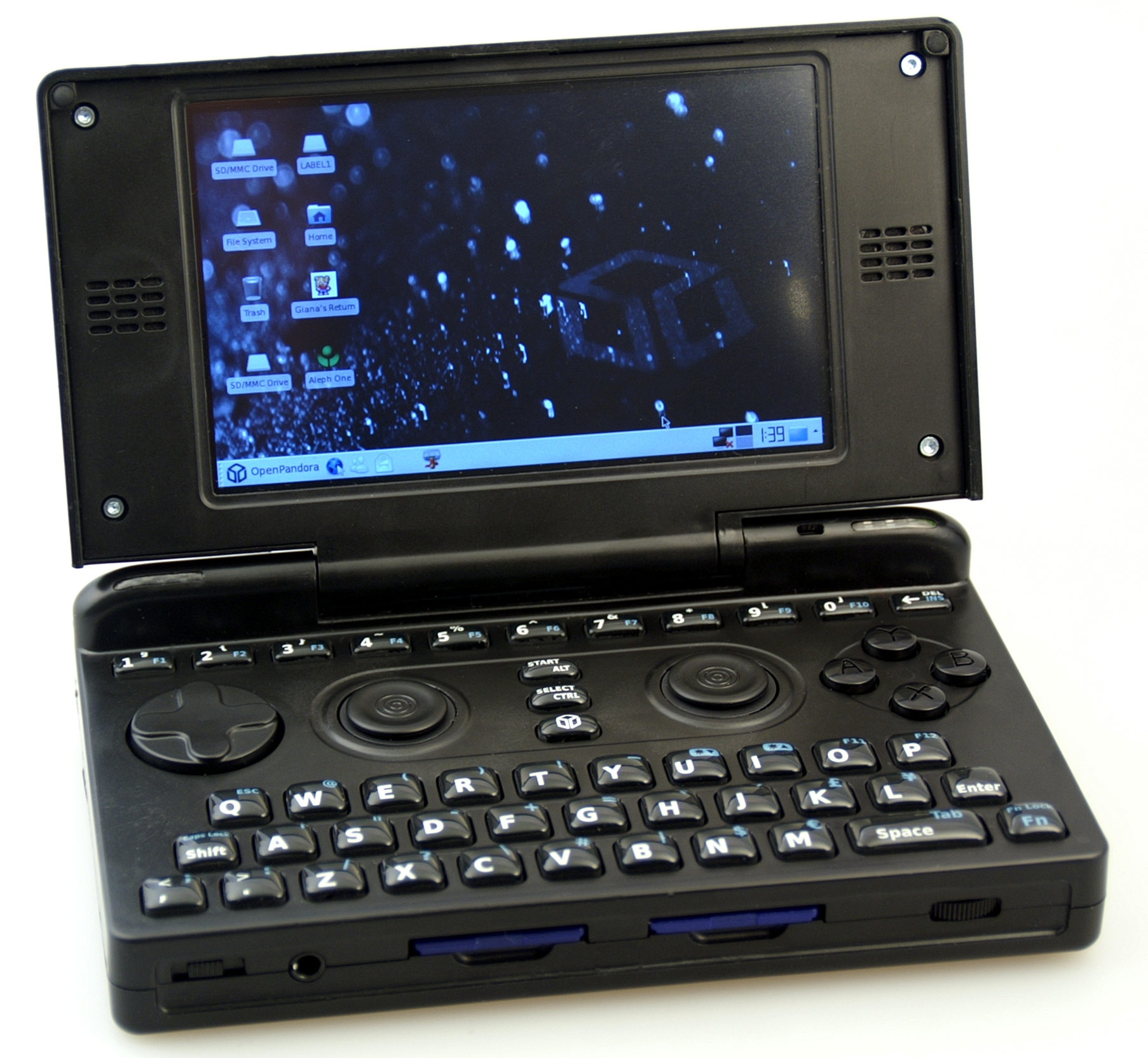
Xfce on the Pandora

Xfce is included as one of the graphical user interfaces on the Pandora handheld gaming system.

It is the default desktop environment in the following Linux distributions:

- BackBox
- Black Lab Linux
- Devuan
- Dragora GNU/Linux-libre
- Emmabuntüs
- GalliumOS
- Guix
- Kali Linux
- The Linux Schools Project
- Linux Lite
- Linux Mint (Xfce Edition)
- Manjaro
- MX Linux
- Mythbuntu
- Pentoo
- Peppermint OS
- QubesOS
- Salix OS
- SolydXK (SolydX)
- SystemRescueCD
- UberStudent
- Ubuntu Studio (until 20.04)
- Void Linux
- Whonix
- Xubuntu

It is also included as a standard desktop option on FreeBSD and derivatives such as GhostBSD, and in many other Linux distributions not listed above, including Arch Linux, Debian, Gentoo, Ubuntu, openSUSE, Fedora, Linux Mint, Slackware, Mageia, OpenMandriva, Solus OS, and Zorin OS. Kali Linux also uses Xfce as the desktop environment when running on the ARM platform. Debian makes a separate netinstall CD available that installs Xfce as the default desktop environment. In 2013, Debian briefly made it the default environment, replacing GNOME.

== See also ==
- LXQt
- LXDE
- MATE
