= GalliumOS =

Chrome hardware

- OS family: Linux (Unix-like)
- Working state: Discontinued
- Initial release: 10 November 2015; 10 years ago
- Latest release: 3.1 / 22 December 2019; 6 years ago
- Latest preview: 3.1 / 22 December 2019; 6 years ago
- Available in: i18n
- Update method: apt
- Package manager: dpkg
- Supported platforms: x86-64
- Userland: GNU General Public License
- Default user interface: Xfce
- License: Various
- Official website: galliumos.org

GalliumOS was a Linux distribution for ChromeOS devices, developed by the community-supported GalliumOS project. The distribution was made for Chrome hardware including Chromebook, Chromebox, Chromebit and Chromebase. GalliumOS beta1 was released on 10 November 2015.

As of 2022, the GalliumOS project has been discontinued. Its wiki advises existing GalliumOS users to migrate to another Linux OS due to security hazards.

== Features ==
GalliumOS was based on Xubuntu and maintained compatibility with the Ubuntu repositories. Multiple sources indicate that Gallium's boot time was faster than other Linux distributions made for ChromeOS. It was optimized to limit stalls and had integrated touchpad drivers.

GalliumOS was compatible with some ChromeOS devices. It was necessary to prepare the device in different ways based on the hardware chipset.

== Prerequisites ==
Some Chromebooks require a third-party firmware update before they can boot other operating systems, including GalliumOS. Chromebook firmware can be updated after disabling hardware write-protect, a process that varies by model. A firmware installer script is available for most models, written by MrChromebox.
