= Linux Lite =

Lightweight Linux distribution based on Ubuntu LTS

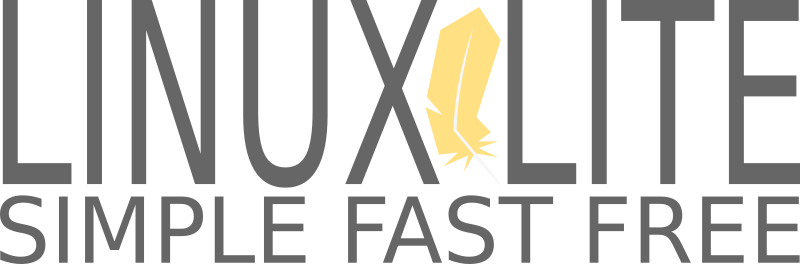

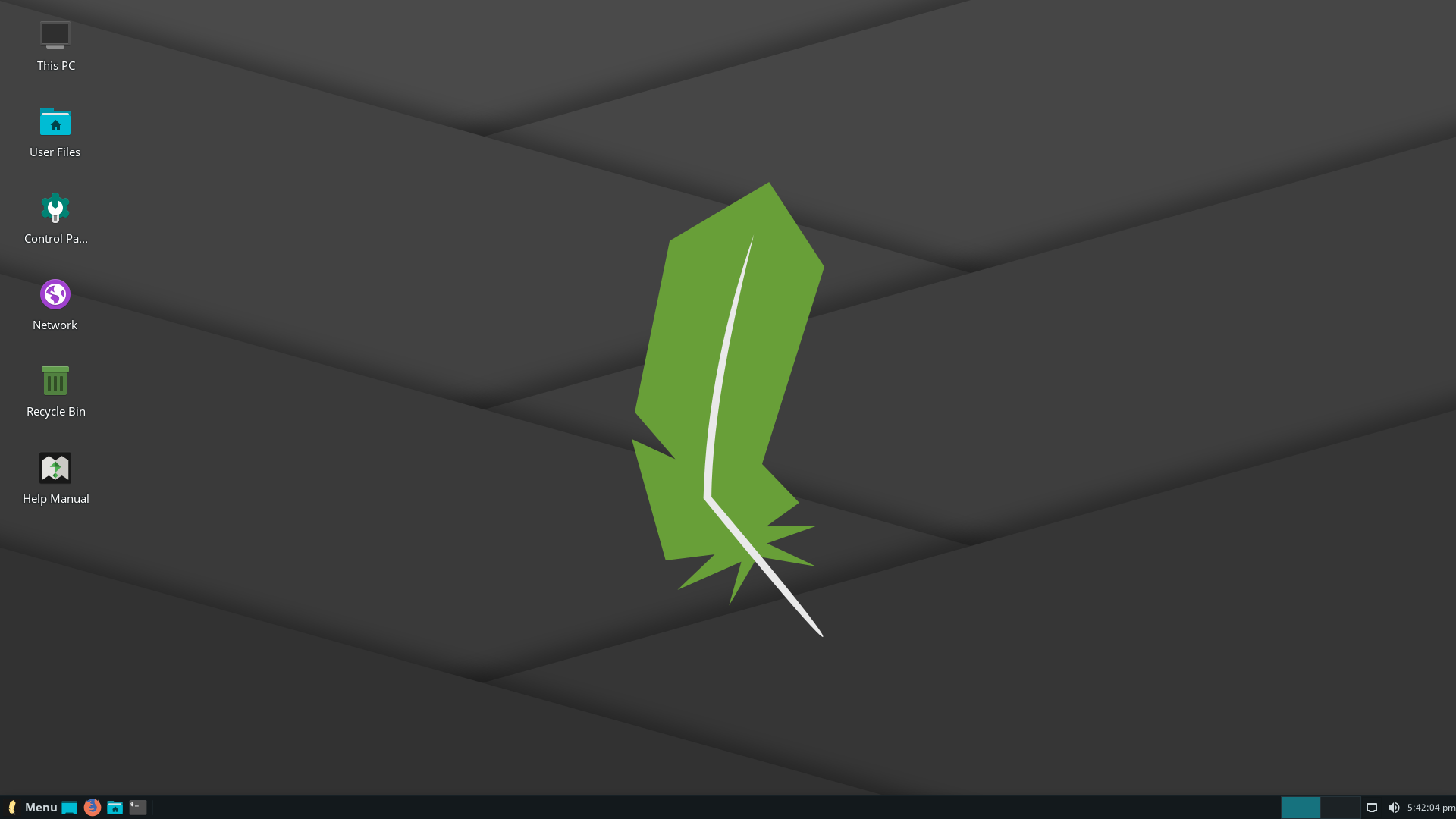
- Developer: Jerry Bezencon
- OS family: Linux (Unix-like)
- Working state: Current
- Source model: Open source and closed source
- Initial release: Linux Lite 1.0.0 / 26 October 2012; 12 years ago
- Latest release: 7.4 / 31 March 2025; 6 months ago
- Marketing target: Linux beginners; Windows users
- Update method: apt
- Package manager: dpkg
- Supported platforms: IA-32, x86-64
- Kernel type: Linux kernel
- Userland: GNU
- Default user interface: Xfce
- License: Mainly GPL and other free software licenses, some proprietary
- Official website: www.linuxliteos.com

Linux Lite is a Linux distribution based on Ubuntu LTS created by a team of programmers led by Jerry Bezencon. Created in 2012, it uses a customized implementation of Xfce as its desktop environment, and runs on the main Linux kernel.

The distribution aims to appeal to Linux beginners and Windows users, by trying to make the transition from Windows to Linux as smooth as possible. To achieve this, the distribution tries to conserve many of the visual and functional elements of Windows, to create an experience that can be perceived as familiar by Windows users. Additionally, the distro sets out to "dispel the myth that Linux is hard to use", by trying to offer a simple and intuitive desktop experience.

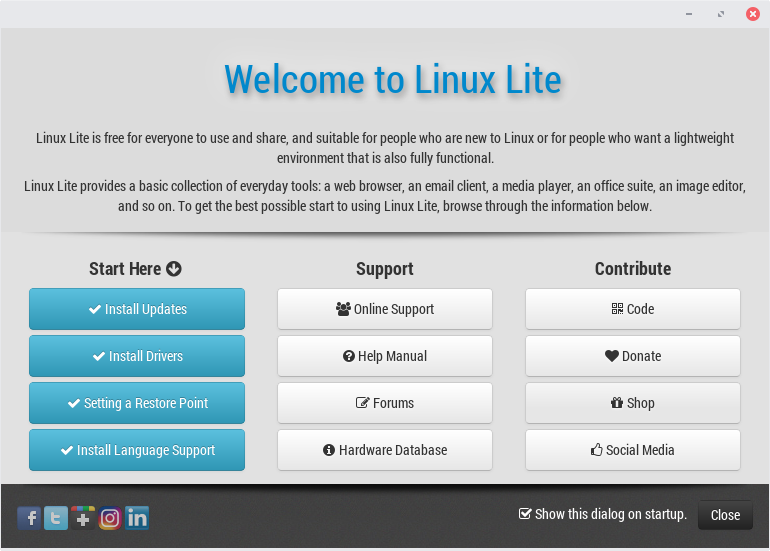
Welcome Center

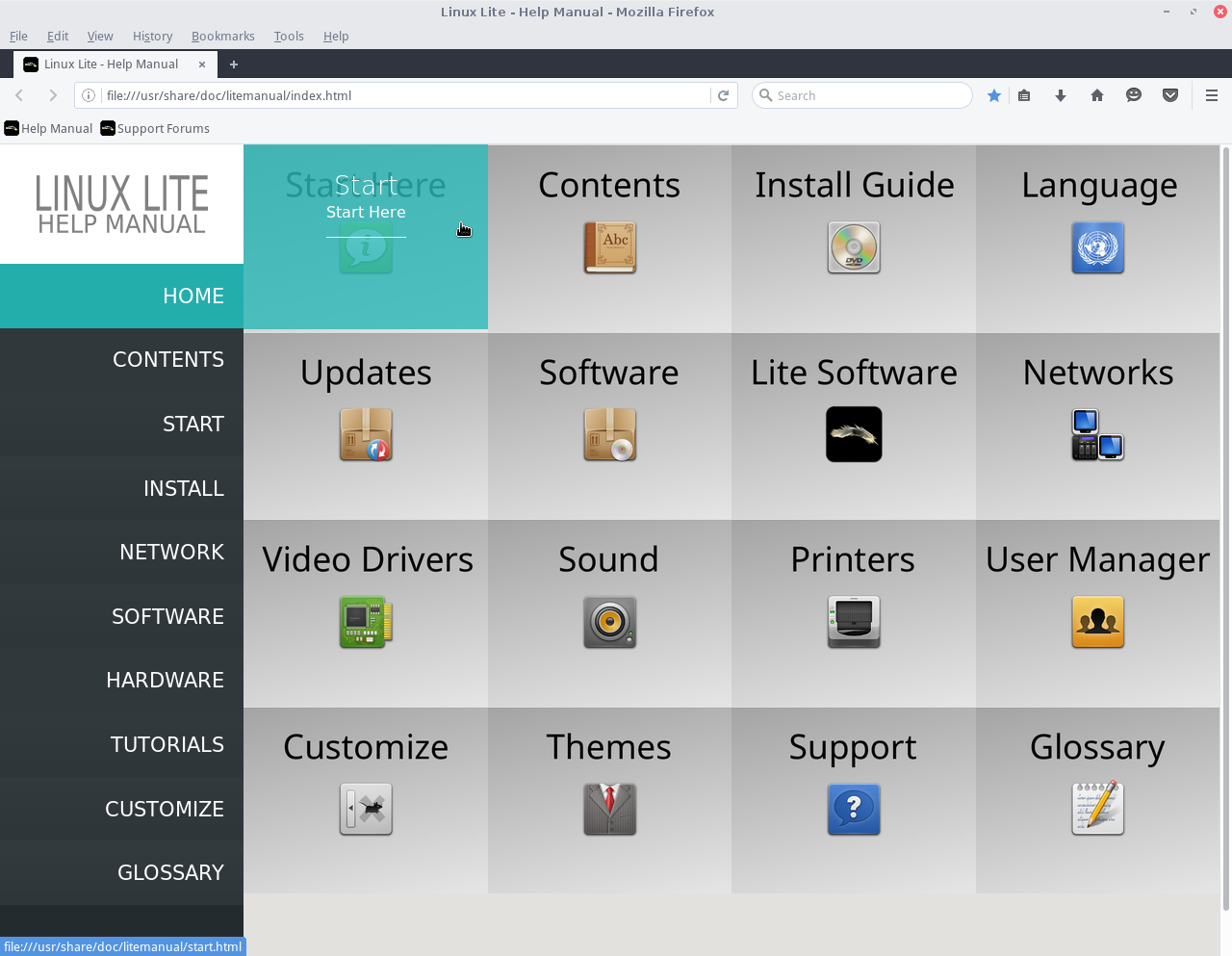
Help Manual

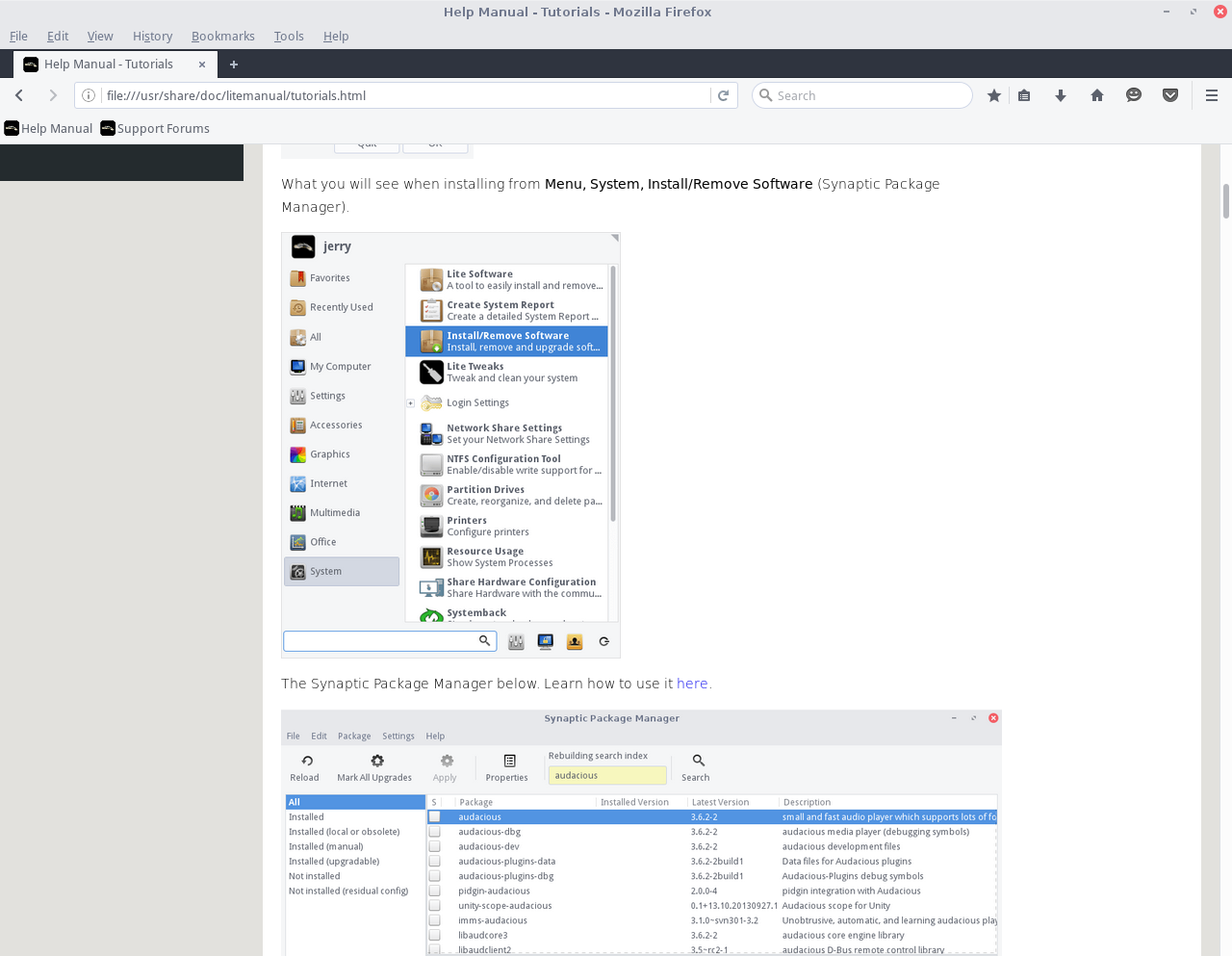
Screen shots from the Help Manual

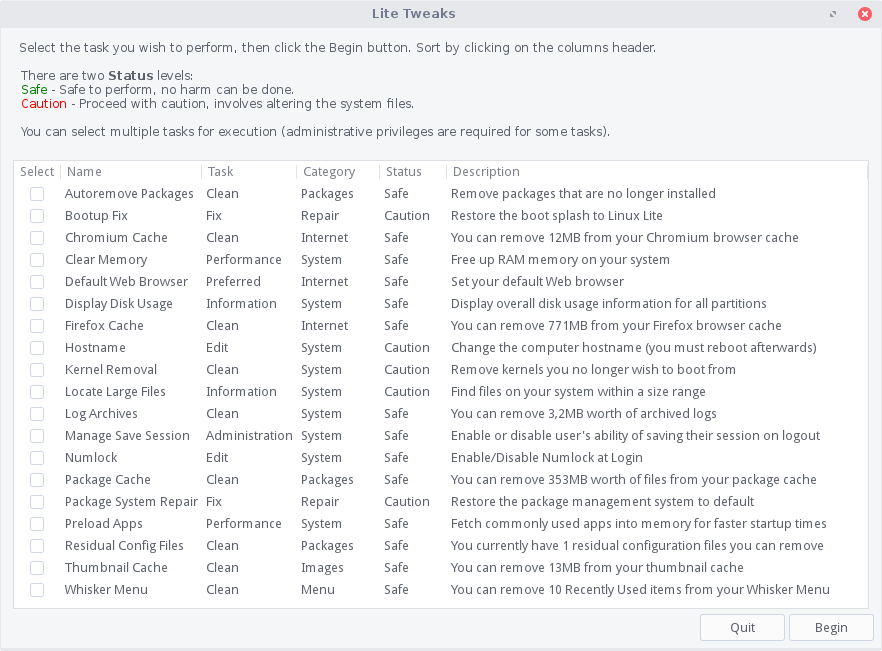
Lite Tweaks

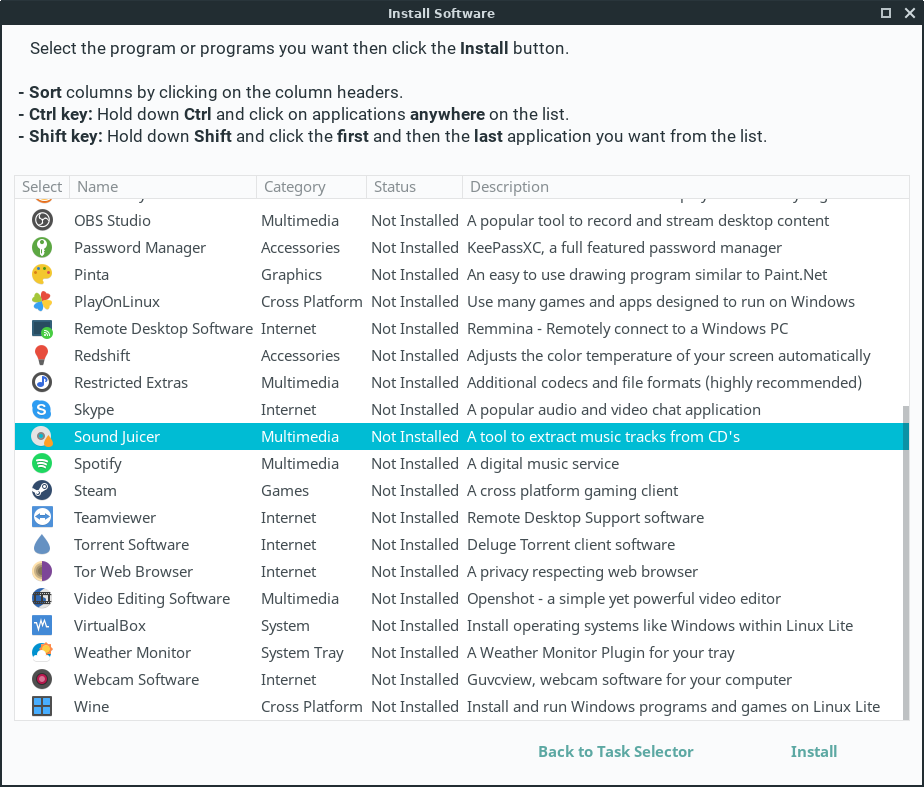
Lite Software, for installing popular software.

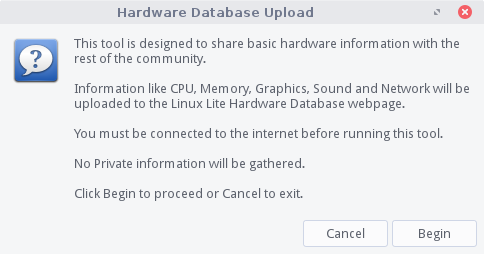
Lite Info, an application for uploading system information to the community hardware database

== See also ==
- Ubuntu
