= FeatherPad =

Free software text editor written in Qt

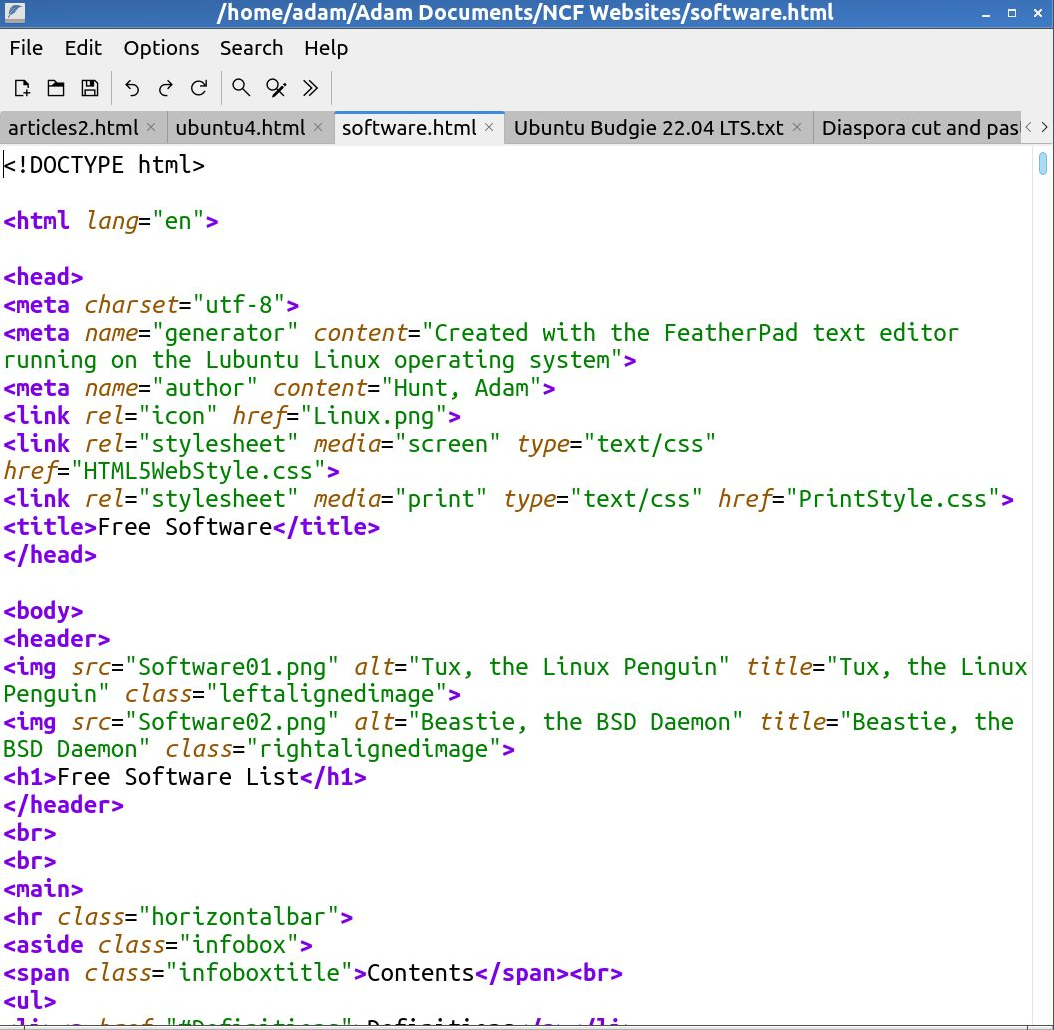
- FeatherPad 1.0.1 showing HTML5 syntax highlighting
- Original author: Pedram Pourang (Tsu Jan)
- Initial release: 2016; 10 years ago
- Stable release: 1.4.1 / 12 June 2023
- Written in: C++, Qt
- Operating system: BSD, Linux, Haiku OS, macOS
- Available in: 22 languages
- Type: Text editor
- License: GPL-3.0-or-later
- Website: github.com/tsujan/FeatherPad

FeatherPad is a free software text editor available under the GPL-3.0-or-later license. It is developed by Pedram Pourang (a.k.a. Tsu Jan) of Iran, written in Qt, and runs on FreeBSD, Linux, Haiku OS and macOS. It has few dependencies and is independent of any desktop environment.

FeatherPad has been the default text editor in Lubuntu, since it switched to the LXQt desktop with Lubuntu 18.10. Prior to that Lubuntu used the Leafpad text editor as part of its GTK-based LXDE desktop. FeatherPad is also included in the Debian and Ubuntu package repositories.

== Development ==
Pourang started the project to fill a perceived gap in available text editors. He identified that many feature-rich text editors are RAM-intensive and even then lack key features.

Development of FeatherPad started in 2016, with the first public release version 0.5.8. The first version included syntax highlighting and was written in GTK. With the introduction of GTK 3 the application was rewritten, but Pourang found Qt more flexible and it was rewritten in C++ and ported to Qt starting with version 0.6 in April 2017. FeatherPad added spell checking using Hunspell, starting with version 0.11.0, released in August 2019.

FeatherPad has been translated into 21 different languages in addition to English.

Haiku OS support was written by Khallebal at GitHub and support for macOS was added by Pavel Shlyak.

Future development goals for FeatherPad include syntax highlighting color customization, virtual desktop awareness and tab drag-and-drop under Wayland.

== Features ==
Original FeatherPad logo

FeatherPad includes text drag and drop support, search, search and replace, optional line numbering, automatic detection of text encoding, syntax highlighting for many common programming languages, ability to open URLs in a browser, optional side-pane or tabbed page navigation and spell-checking.

The text editor is highly customizable and by default has a wide range of keyboard shortcuts defined.

There is an unofficial Snap package available for FeatherPad.

== Reception ==
A review in Full Circle in August 2019 noted, "FeatherPad has obviously been designed for software developers, but it is also a good text editor for any general user to write plain text documents or web pages on." The review noted its relatively low RAM use compared to more full-featured text editors like jEdit and gedit. It also praised its extensive, if non-standard keyboard shortcuts, noting, "the keyboard shortcuts are all nicely explained in the menus, however, and, once learned, FeatherPad becomes very fast to use."

Scott Nesbitt, writing in March 2020, on Red Hat's opensource.com noted, "when you first fire it up, FeatherPad doesn't look much different from most text editors out there. It does launch quickly, though. FeatherPad's features include automatic syntax highlighting of markup and coding languages, automatically closing brackets (again, useful when working with markup and coding languages), and an extensive set of keyboard shortcuts. One feature that grew on me was the ability to position document tabs. In most text editors that open documents in separate tabs, those tabs appear along the top of the editor window. With FeatherPad, you can put tabs at the top, bottom, left, or right. I've found that putting the tabs on the left reduces visual clutter and distractions."

== See also ==
- List of text editors
- Comparison of text editors
