= Olivier Fourdan =

French computer programmer

- Born: France
- Occupation: Software engineer
- Employer: Red Hat
- Notable work: Xfce

Olivier Fourdan is the creator of the Xfce desktop environment, for which development began at the end of 1996.

He started his career as a new technologies production engineer, web developer, and embedded Linux systems engineer.

Fourdan has been working for Red Hat since 2007, interrupted by 2 years at Intel during 2013 and 2014. Since 2017, he has been active in the adoption of Wayland, working on many different components, including GTK, Mutter, GNOME Control Center, XWayland, and Mesa3D.
