= Edubuntu =

Official derivative of Ubuntu for educational institutions

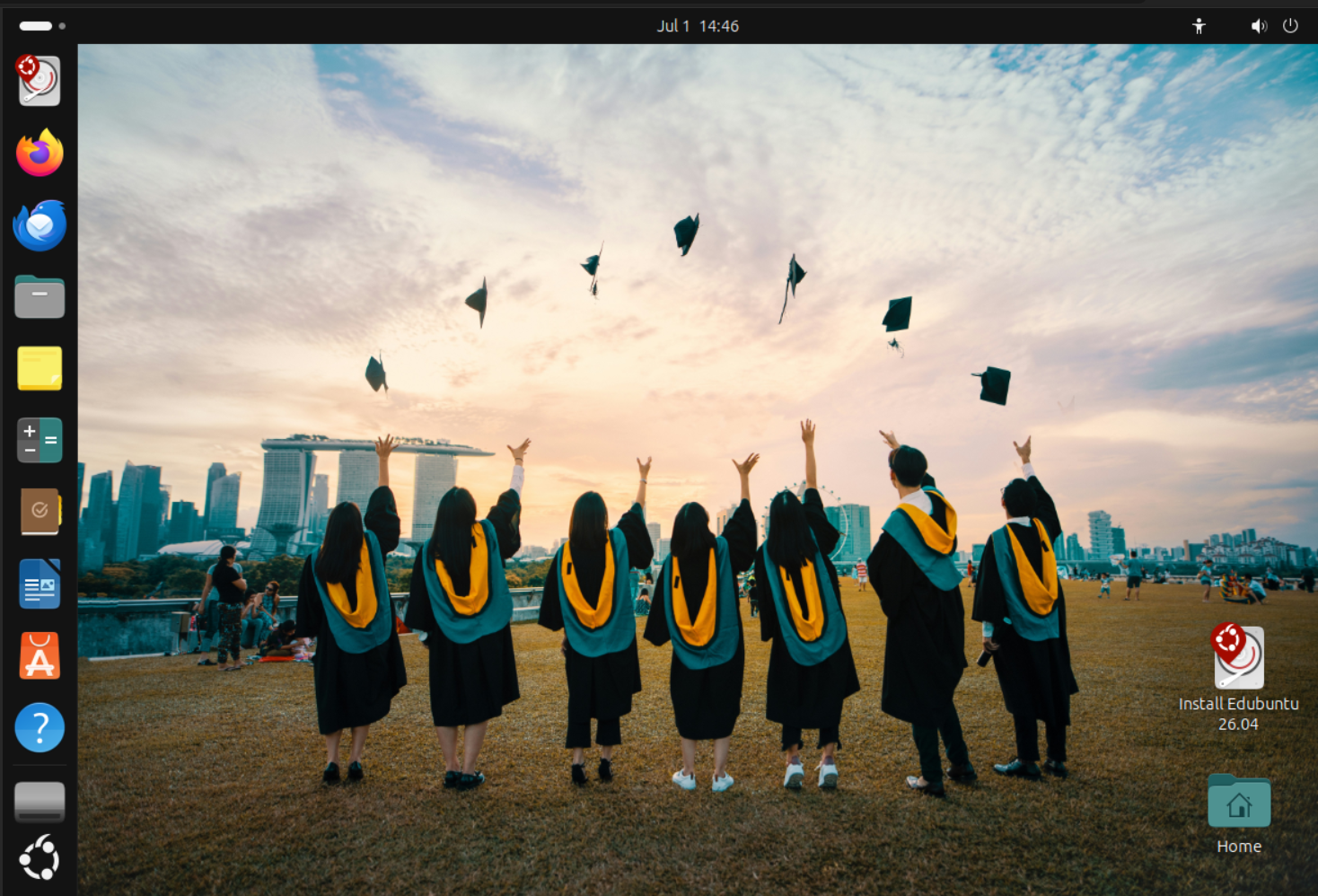
- Edubuntu 26.04
- Developer: Canonical Ltd. and community contributors
- OS family: Linux (Unix-like)
- Working state: Current
- Source model: Open source
- Initial release: October 15, 2005; 21 years ago
- Latest release: 26.10 (Stonking Stingray) / 15 October 2026; 1 day ago
- Kernel type: Monolithic Linux kernel
- Default user interface: GNOME
- License: Mainly GPL and various others (free with some restricted components)
- Official website: www.edubuntu.org

Edubuntu is an official derivative of the Ubuntu operating system designed for use in classrooms inside schools, homes, and communities.

== Features ==
Edubuntu is based largely on the standard GNOME-based Ubuntu distribution. Curated sets of applications (metapackages) and default desktop settings tailored to specific age groups (including preschool, primary, secondary, and tertiary education) can be selected during the installation. Applications are sorted into folders for specific subject areas, and can be hidden system-wide by an administrator.

Previous iterations of Edubuntu were bundled with the Linux Terminal Server Project (LTSP)—intended to allow a computer running Edubuntu to serve multiple thin clients in a computer lab environment, classroom management software ITALC, and software for restricting desktop settings and applications.

== Project goals ==
The primary goal of Edubuntu was to enable an educator with limited technical knowledge and skills to set up a computer lab or an online learning environment in an hour or less and then effectively administer that environment.

The principal design goals of Edubuntu were centralized management of configuration, users, and processes, together with facilities for working collaboratively in a classroom setting. Equally important was the gathering together of the best available free software and digital materials for education. According to a statement of goals on the official Edubuntu website: "Our aim is to put together a system that contains all the best free software available in education and make it easy to install and maintain."

It also aimed to allow low-income environments to maximize utilisation of their available (older) equipment.

== Versions ==
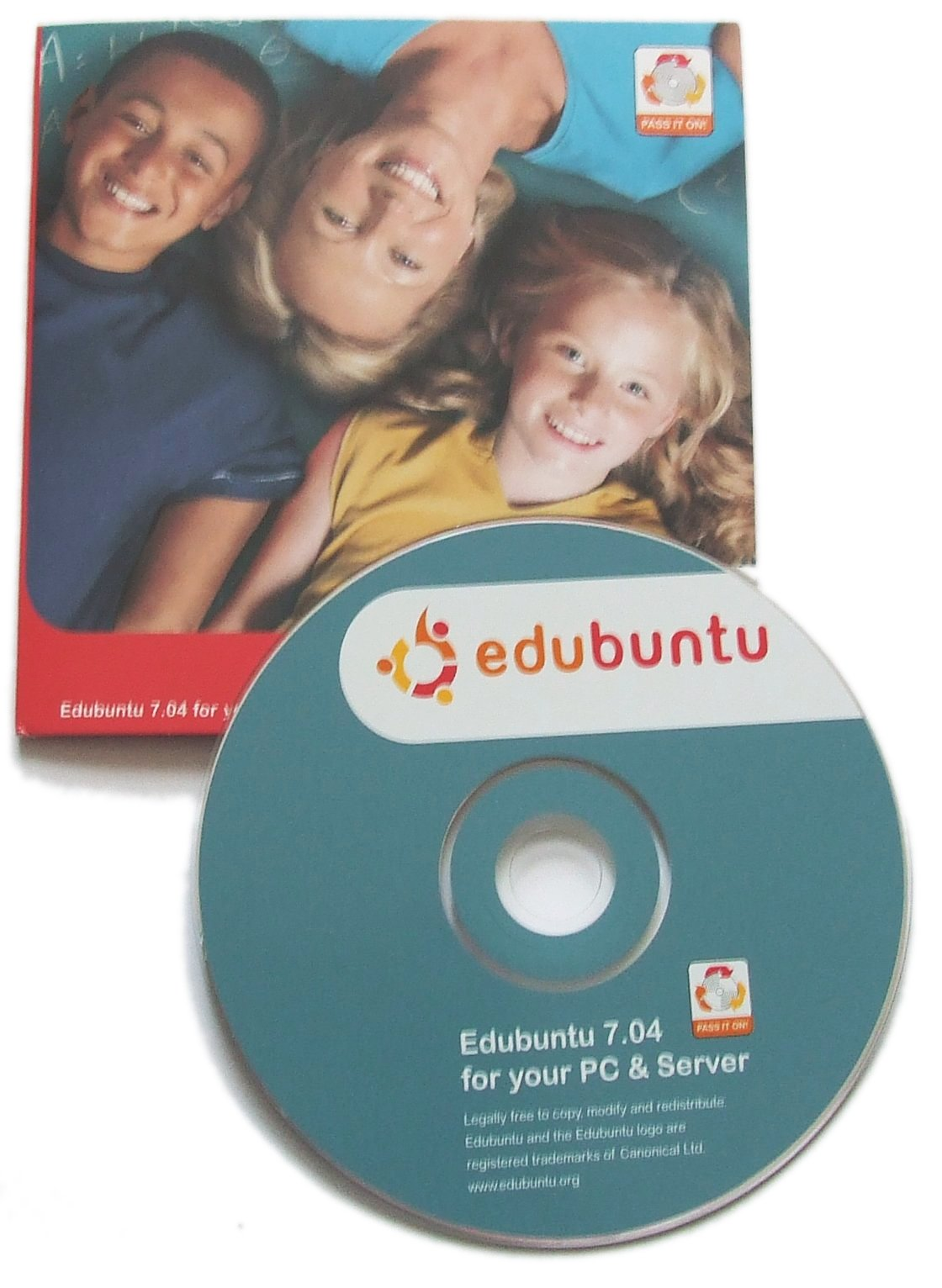
Edubuntu 7.04 package.

The first Edubuntu release coincided with the release of Ubuntu 5.10, which was codenamed Breezy Badger, on 2005-10-13. On Ubuntu 8.04, Edubuntu was replaced with Ubuntu Education Edition, which was an add-on CD intended for installing the Edubuntu packages on top of an existing Ubuntu installation.

From version 9.10 onwards, Edubuntu returned to being a standalone distribution.

Beginning with 14.04, Edubuntu was to be released only for Ubuntu long-term support (LTS) versions, after Jonathan Carter and Stéphane Graber stepped down from Edubuntu to focus on other projects. It was eventually announced that Edubuntu would not be released for Ubuntu 16.04, due to a lack of contributors.

In December 2022, it was announced that Edubuntu would be revived to target the Ubuntu 23.04 cycle, with development headed by Ubuntu Studio head Erich Eickmeyer and his wife Amy, an early childhood educator. The revived project adopted a tightened goal of providing software for different age groups, as well as associated customization options, on top of the current Ubuntu desktop environment.

Release	Codename	Release date	End-of-life date
5.10	Breezy Badger	October 13, 2005	April 13, 2007
6.06 LTS	Dapper Drake	June 1, 2006	July 14, 2009
6.10	Edgy Eft	October 26, 2006	April 25, 2008
7.04	Feisty Fawn	19 April 2007	19 October 2008
7.10	Gutsy Gibbon	18 October 2007	18 April 2009
8.04 LTS	Hardy Heron	24 April 2008	12 May 2011
8.10	Intrepid Ibex	30 October 2008	30 April 2010
9.04	Jaunty Jackalope	23 April 2009	23 October 2010
9.10	Karmic Koala	29 October 2009	29 April 2011
10.04 LTS	Lucid Lynx	29 April 2010	9 May 2013
10.10	Maverick Meerkat	10 October 2010	10 April 2012
11.04	Natty Narwhal	28 April 2011	28 October 2012
11.10	Oneiric Ocelot	13 October 2011	9 May 2013
12.04 LTS	Precise Pangolin	26 April 2012	28 April 2017
12.10	Quantal Quetzal	18 October 2012	16 May 2014
13.04	Raring Ringtail	25 April 2013	27 January 2014
13.10	Saucy Salamander	17 October 2013	17 July 2014
14.04 LTS	Trusty Tahr	17 April 2014	30 April 2019
23.04	Lunar Lobster	20 April 2023	25 January 2024
23.10	Mantic Minotaur	12 October 2023	July 2024
24.04 LTS	Noble Numbat	25 April 2024	April 2027
24.10	Oracular Oriole	10 October 2024	July 2025
25.04	Plucky Puffin	17 April 2025	January 2026
25.10	Questing Quokka	9 October 2025	9 July 2026
26.04 LTS	Resolute Raccoon	23 April 2026	April 2029
26.10	Stonking Stingray	15 October 2026	July 2027
Legend: Old version, not maintained Older version, still maintained Current stable version Future version

== See also ==
- List of Ubuntu-based distributions
- Comparison of Linux distributions
- UberStudent – Educational Linux distribution based on LTS versions of Xubuntu
- Sugar-on-a-Stick – Educational Linux distribution based on Fedora
