= Comparison of Linux distributions =

Technical variations of Linux distributions include support for different hardware devices and systems or software package configurations. Organizational differences may be motivated by historical reasons. Other criteria include security, including how quickly security upgrades are available; ease of package management; and number of packages available.

These tables compare notable distribution's latest stable release on wide-ranging objective criteria. It does not cover each operating system's subjective merits, branches marked as unstable or beta, nor compare Linux distributions with other operating systems.

== General ==
The table below shows general information about the distributions: founder or producer, maintainer, release date, the latest version, etc.

Linux distributions endorsed by the Free Software Foundation are marked 100% Free under the System distribution commitment column.

| Distribution | Founder | Maintainer | Initial release year | Current stable version | Security updates (years) | Release date | System distribution commitment | Forked from | Target audience | Cost | Status |
|---|---|---|---|---|---|---|---|---|---|---|---|
| AlmaLinux | AlmaLinux OS Foundation | AlmaLinux OS Foundation | 2021 | 10.2 | 10 years | 2026-05-26 | X | Red Hat Enterprise Linux (RHEL) | general | None | Active |
| Alpine Linux | Alpine Linux Team | Alpine Linux Team | 2006 | 3.24.4 | ? | 2026-11-05 | X | LEAF Project | security, lightweight, general | None | Active |
| ALT Linux | ALT Linux Team | ALT Linux Team, ALT Linux LLC | 2001 | 11.2 | ? | 2026-07-15 | X | Mandrake Linux | general, school | None | Active |
| antiX | Anticapitalista | Anticapitalista | 2007 | 26.1 | ? | 2026-09-29 | X | Debian, MEPIS | old computers | None | Active |
| ArchBang | Willensky Aristide | Stan McLaren | 2011 | Rolling | Rolling | Rolling | X | Arch Linux (UKM Edition) | general | None | Active |
| Arch Linux | Judd Vinet | dev team | 2002 | Rolling | Rolling | Rolling | X | Independent, inspired from CRUX | general | None | Active |
| BLAG | Brixton Linux Action Group | Brixton Linux Action Group | 2002 | 140000 spartakus | ? | 2011-05-04 | 100% Free: GNU FSDG | Fedora | desktop | None | Inactive |
| Bodhi Linux | Bodhi Linux Team | Bodhi Linux Team | 2011 | 7.0.0 | ? | 2023-08-21 | X | Debian, Ubuntu | desktop, lightweight | None | Unclear |
| Canaima | CANTV / CNTI / CENTIDEL / Edelca / VIT / FUNDACITE / Free software community | CANTV / CNTI / CENTIDEL / Edelca / VIT / FUNDACITE / Free software community | 2007 | 8.4 kavanayen | ? | 2026-05-04 | X | Debian, Ubuntu | Government of Venezuela | None | Active |
| CentOS | CentOS Project | CentOS Project | 2003 | 8.5.2111 | 10 years | 2021-11-16 | X | Red Hat Enterprise Linux (RHEL) | server, workstation | None | Inactive |
| CentOS Stream | CentOS Project | CentOS Project | 2019 | 10 | 5 years | 2024-12-12 | X | Upstream of Red Hat Enterprise Linux (RHEL) | server, workstation | None | Active |
| Chakra | Jan Mette and Arch Linux KDEmod developers | The Chakra Project Team | 2010 | Rolling | Rolling | Rolling | X | Arch Linux | desktop | None | Inactive |
| Chimera Linux | q66 | Chimera Linux team | 2021 | Rolling | Rolling | Rolling | X | Independent | general | None | Active |
| ChromeOS | Sundar Pichai | Google | 2011 | 16836.33.0 | Rolling | 2026-11-13 | X | Gentoo Linux | web applications | None | Active |
| Clear Linux OS | Arjan van de Ven | Intel | 2015 | Rolling | Rolling | Rolling | X | Independent | container, server, desktop | None | Inactive |
| ClearOS | Peter Baldwin | ClearFoundation | 2000 | 7.9.1 | ? | 2021-10-13 | X | RHEL, CentOS | server, gateway, network | Some editions are free of charge | Inactive |
| CrunchBang++ | Ben Young | CrunchBang community | 2015 | 13.0 | ? | 2025-08-19 | X | Debian | lightweight, desktop | Free | Active |
| CrunchBang Linux | Philip Newborough | Philip Newborough | 2008 | 11 | ? | 2013-05-6 | X | Debian | desktop | None | Inactive |
| CRUX | Per Lidén | CRUX Community | 2002 | 3.8 | ? | 2025-04-21 | X | Independent | general | None | Active |
| Damn Small Linux | John Andrews | dev team | 2003 | 4.4.10 | ? | 2008-11-18 | X | Debian, Knoppix | lightweight, portable | None | Inactive |
| Debian | Ian Murdock | Debian Project | 1993 | 13.7 | 5 years (Note: Debian releases are officially supported for 1 year after the subsequent release, with releases being approximately 2 years apart. The Debian LTS Project provides community based support extending the complete support period to 5 years.); 10 years Freexian ELTS (paid) | 2026-09-12 | Debian Social Contract and DFSG (main was 100% free, till 2022, non-free packages were optional) | Independent, inspired by Softlanding Linux System (SLS) | general, server, desktop | None | Active |
| Devuan | The "Veteran Unix Admins" (VUA) | The "Veteran Unix Admins" (VUA) | 2017 | 6.1 | ? | 2026-01-02 | X (Note: Default ISOs included non-free software) | Debian | general | None | Active |
| Deepin | Wuhan Deepin Technology Co., Ltd. | Wuhan Deepin Technology Co., Ltd. | 2004 | 23.1 | ? | 2025-04-16 | X | Debian | general | None | Active |
| Dragora GNU/Linux-Libre | Matias A. Fonzo | Matias A. Fonzo | 2009 | 3.0-beta2 | ? | 2023-04-26 | 100% Free: GNU FSDG | Independent, inspired from Slackware | general | None | Inactive |
| dyne:bolic | Jaromil | Jaromilx | 2005 | 3.0.0 | ? | 2011-09-08 | 100% Free: GNU FSDG | Debian | multimedia | None | Inactive |
| Elementary OS | Danielle Foré | elementary LLC | 2011 | 8.1.1 | ? | 2026-02-26 | X | Ubuntu, Debian | general | None | Active |
| Emdebian Grip | Embedded Debian Project | Embedded Debian Project | 2009 | | End-of-life | | X | Debian | embedded systems | None | Inactive |
| EndeavourOS | Bryan Poerwoatmodjo | EndeavourOS | 2019 | Rolling | ? | 2022-09-14 | X | Arch Linux | general | None | Active |
| Fedora Linux | Fedora Project | Fedora Project | 2003 | 45 | 1 year + 1 month | 2026-11-03 | Fedora Licensing Guidelines | Red Hat Linux | general | None | Active |
| Freespire | Lindows.com, Inc. | PC/OpenSystems LLC | 2001 | 10 | ? | 2023-12-07 | X | Ubuntu | desktop | None | Active |
| Gentoo Linux | Daniel Robbins | Gentoo Foundation, Inc. | 2002 | Rolling | Rolling | Rolling | Gentoo Social Contract | Enoch Linux | general | None | Active |
| Guix System | Ludovic Courtès | Ludovic Courtès, Ricardo Wurmus, the Guix community | 2012 | 1.5.0 | Rolling | 2026-01-23 | 100% Free: GNU FSDG | Independent, inspired by NixOS | general | None | Active |
| gNewSense | Brian Brazil and Paul O'Malley | Sam Geeraerts with sponsorship from the Free Software Foundation | 2006 | 4.0 | ? | 2016-05-02 | 100% Free: GNU FSDG | Debian | general, server | None | Inactive |
| Grml | Michael Prokop | The Grml Team | 2005 | 2026.04 | ? | 2026-04-30 | X | Debian | live, maintenance, security, network, forensic, accessibility | None | Active |
| Hyperbola GNU/Linux-libre | Hyperbola Founders | Hyperbola Founders | 2017 | 0.4.4 | 5 years (old stable); 3 years (stable) | 2024-01-05 | 100% Free: GNU FSDG followed in Hyperbola Social Contract | Arch Linux | general | None | Active |
| IPFire | Michael Tremer | IPFire Project | 2004 | 2.29 - Core Update 197 | Rolling | 2025-9-19 | X | Independent | firewall, router, security | None | Active |
| Kali Linux | Max Moser, Mati Aharoni, Martin J. Muench | Offensive Security | 2013 | 2026.3 | ? | 2026-10-26 | X | Debian | auditing, forensic, security, network | None | Active |
| Knoppix | Klaus Knopper | dev team | 2000 | 9.3 | ? | 2022-05-05 | X | Debian | live | None | Active |
| Korora | Chris Smart | Dev Team | 2005 | 26 | ? | 2017-09-16 | X | Fedora | desktop | None | Inactive |
| LibreCMC | LibreCMC team | LibreCMC team | 2010 | 1.5.14 | ? | 2023-10-03 | 100% Free: GNU FSDG | Merged from LibreWRT | embedded systems | None | Active |
| Linspire | Linspire, Inc. | Linspire, Inc. | 2001 | 14 SP2 | ? | 2025-02-22 | X | ? | ? | Commercial | Active |
| Linux Mint | Clement Lefebvre | dev team | 2006 | 22.3 | 5 years (main editions); 3 years (LMDE) | 2026-01-13 | X | Debian (LMDE), Ubuntu (main editions) | desktop | None | Active |
| Linux Lite | Jerry Bezencon | Linux Lite Team | 2012 | 8.2 | ? | 2026-10-31 | X | Ubuntu | desktop | None | Active |
| Mageia | Mageia Community | mageia.org | 2011 | 10 | 2 years | 2026-06-28 | X | Mandriva Linux | general | None | Active |
| Mandriva Linux | Mandrakesoft S.A. | Mandriva S.A. | 1998 | 2011.0 | ? | 2011-08-28 | X | Red Hat Linux | general | Some editions are free of charge | Inactive |
| Manjaro Linux | Roland Singer | dev team | 2012 | Rolling | Rolling | Rolling | X | Arch Linux | general | None | Active |
| MEPIS | Warren Woodford | MEPIS LLC | 2003 | 11.9.92 | ? | 2013-08-10 | X | Debian | desktop, server | None | Inactive |
| Miracle Linux | Cybertrust Japan | Cybertrust Japan | 2000 | 9 | 10 years (paid) | 2022-11-01 | X | Red Hat Enterprise Linux (RHEL) | server | None | Active |
| Musix GNU+Linux | Musix team | Musix team | 2008 | 3.0.1 | ? | 2014-03-13 | 100% Free: GNU FSDG | Debian | multimedia | None | Inactive |
| MX Linux | MX Linux team | MX Linux team | 2013 | 25.1 | 5 years | 2026-01-19 | X | Debian, MEPIS, antiX | desktop | None | Active |
| Netrunner | Blue Systems | dev team | 2009 | 26 | Debian packages as per Debian | 2026-04-02 | X | Debian | desktop | None | Active |
| NixOS | Eelco Dolstra and Armijn Hemel | NixOS Foundation | 2003 | 26.05 | 0.5 years | 2026-06-30 | X | – | general, server, desktop | None | Active |
| Novell Open Enterprise Server | Novell | Novell, Inc. dev team | 2003 | 2023 | ? | 2022-10 | X | SUSE Linux Enterprise Server | server | Commercial | Active |
| OpenELEC | Stephan Raue, OpenELEC Team | OpenELEC Team | 2011 | 8.0.4 | ? | 2017-06-04 | X | Kodi | multimedia | None | Inactive |
| openSUSE | SUSE Linux | openSUSE Project | 2006 | 16.1 | 2 years | 2026-11-03 | X | Slackware, Jurix | general, desktop | None | Active |
| OpenWrt | ? | OpenWrt team | 2004 | 25.12.6 | ? | 2026-10-18 | X | Independent | embedded systems | None | Active |
| OpenMandriva Lx | OpenMandriva Association | OpenMandriva Association | 2013 | 6.0 | 1 year | 2025-04-20 | X | Mandriva Linux | general | None | Active |
| Oracle Linux | Oracle Corporation | Oracle Corporation | 2006 | 10.1 | ? | 2025-12-02 | X | Red Hat Enterprise Linux (RHEL) | server | None | Active |
| Parabola GNU/Linux-libre | Parabola Hackers | Parabola Hackers | 2009 | Rolling | Rolling | 2021-08-11 | 100% Free: GNU FSDG followed in Parabola Social Contract | Arch Linux | general | None | Active |
| Pardus | Scientific and Technological Research Council of Turkey (TÜBİTAK) | TÜBİTAK | 2005 | 25.0 | ? | 2025-11-25 | X | Gentoo (2011.2); Debian | general | None | Active |
| Parrot OS | Lorenzo "Palinuro" Faletra | Parrot Dev Team | 2013 | 7.4 | Rolling | 2026-10-03 | X | Debian | security, desktop | None | Active |
| Parsix | Alan Baghumian | Parsix Project | 2005 | 8.15 | ? | 2017-01-25 | X | Debian | desktop | None | Inactive |
| Parted Magic | Patrick Verner | Parted Magic LLC. | 2007 | | ? | | X | Independent | live, maintenance | Commercial | Active |
| PCLinuxOS | Bill Reynolds | dev team | 2003 | 2025.09 | Semi-rolling | 2025-09-20 | X | Mandriva Linux | desktop | None | Active |
| Pop! OS | Carl Ritchell | System76 | 2017 | 24.04 LTS | 2 years for LTS releases 2–3 months after the next release for other releases. | 2025-12-11 | X | Ubuntu | desktop, laptop | None | Active |
| Pentoo | Michael Zanetta, Rick Farina, Jens Pranaitis | Pentoo | 2005 | 2019.1 | ? | 2019-01-17 | X | Gentoo Linux | auditing, security | None | Active |
| Porteus | Fanthom | Porteus | 2010 | 5.01 | ? | 2023-09-26 | X | Slackware | lightweight, portable | None | Active |
| Puppy Linux | Barry Kauler | Puppy Foundation | 2003 | 9.5 | ? | 2020-09-17 | X | Independent, inspired from Vector linux | lightweight, portable | None | Active |
| PureOS | Todd Weaver | Purism | 2009 | 11 | Stable and Rolling | 2026-05-20 | 100% Free: GNU FSDG | Debian | general, security, privacy | None | Active |
| Qubes OS | Joanna Rutkowska | Invisible Things Lab | 2012 | 4.3.2 | ? | 2026-10-02 | X | Xen and Fedora | security by compartmentalization, desktop | None | Active |
| Red Hat Enterprise Linux (RHEL) | Red Hat | Red Hat | 2002 | 10.3 | 18 years (paid) | 2026-11-11 | X | Red Hat Linux, Fedora | general | Commercial | Active |
| Red Hat Linux | Red Hat | Red Hat | 1995 | 0.9 alias Shrike | ? | 1994-10-31 | X | – | server, workstation | None | Inactive |
| Rocks Cluster Distribution | UCSD Supercomputing Center, Clustercorp | UCSD Supercomputing Center, Clustercorp | 2000 | 7.0 | ? | 2017-12-01 | X | Red Hat Linux | server, workstation | None | Active |
| Rocky Linux | Rocky Enterprise Software Foundation | Rocky Enterprise Software Foundation | 2021 | 10.2 | 10 years | 2026-05-28 | X | Red Hat Enterprise Linux (RHEL) | general | None | Active |
| ROSA | ? | LLC NTC IT ROSA | 2011 | 13.2 | ? | 2026-04-01 | X | Mandriva | server, general | None | Active |
| Sabayon Linux | Fabio Erculiani | dev team | 2005 | 19.03 | ? | 2019-03-31 | X | Gentoo Linux | general | None | Inactive |
| Salix OS | Cyrille Pontvieux, George Vlahavas, Pierrick Le Brun, Thorsten Mühlfelder | Salix team | 2009 | | ? | | X | Slackware | general | None | Active |
| Scientific Linux | CERN, Fermilab | dev team | 2004 | 7.9 | ? | 2020-10-20 | X | Red Hat Linux, Red Hat Enterprise Linux (RHEL) | server, workstation | None | Inactive |
| Slackware | Patrick Volkerding | dev team | 1993 | 15.0 | ? | 2022-02-02 | X | Softlanding Linux System (SLS) | general | None | Active |
| Slax | Tomas Matejicek | Tomas Matejicek | 2002 | 2026.11 | ? | 2026-11-08 | X | Debian, Slackware (until Slax 9) | live | None | Active |
| SliTaz GNU/Linux | Christophe Lincoln | dev team | 2008 | Rolling | Rolling | 2020-02-23 | X | Independent | portable | None | Active |
| Solus | Ikey Doherty | dev team | 2005 | Rolling | Rolling | 2021-07-11 | X | Pardus Linux | desktop | None | Active |
| SolydXK | Arjen Balfoort | dev team | 2013 | 12 | Debian packages as per Debian | 2023-12-04 | X | Debian | desktop | None | Active |
| SparkyLinux | ? | Sparky Linux team | 2012 | 8.2 | ? | 2026-02-16 | X | Debian | general, video games | None | Active |
| Source Mage GNU/Linux | Ryan Abrams, Eric Schabell | dev team | 2002 | | ? | | Source Mage Social Contract | Sorcerer | general | None | Active |
| SteamOS | Valve | Valve | 2013 | 3.9.5 | ? | 2026-10-24 | X | Debian (2.0); Arch Linux (3.0) | video games | None | Active |
| SUSE Linux Enterprise | SUSE | SUSE | 2000 | 16.1 SP5 | 16 years (paid) | 2023-06-20 | Common code base for x86-64, Power, System z, Arm64 | Slackware, Jurix | edge, workstation, server, supercomputer | Commercial | Active |
| Tails | ? | Tails Development Team | 2009 | 7.17 | – (Note: Security updates are released every six weeks.) | 2026-11-11 | X | Debian | security-focused aimed for anonymity and privacy | None | Active |
| Tiny Core Linux | Robert Shingledecker | Team Tiny Core | 2009 | 17.1 | ? | 2026-07-16 | X | Independent, inspired from Damn Small Linux | portable | None | Active |
| Trisquel GNU/Linux | Rubén Rodríguez Pérez (quidam) | Rubén Rodríguez Pérez (quidam) | 2005 | 12.0 | 3 years | 2026-04-11 | 100% Free: GNU FSDG | Ubuntu LTS | desktop | None | Active |
| TurnKey GNU/Linux | Alon Swartz, Liraz Siri | TurnKey GNU/Linux Team | 2008 | 18.0 | Debian packages as per Debian; TurnKey packages for life of current major version (plus backports per request) | 2023-09-14 | Debian Social Contract and DFSG | Debian | server based software appliance library aiming to balance security and ease of use | None | Active |
| Ubuntu and derivatives | Canonical Ltd. | Canonical Ltd. | 2004 | 26.04.1 LTS | 10 years Ubuntu Pro (paid); 5 years (LTS releases); 9 months (Standard releases) | 2026-08-27 | X | Debian | general, server, desktop, supercomputer, IBM mainframe | None | Active |
| Univention Corporate Server | Univention GmbH | Univention GmbH | 2004 | 5.2-6 | 7 years (paid); 6 months Core Edition | 2026-06-15 | X | Debian | home, business, and school | Core Edition is free of charge | Active |
| Ututo | Diego Saravia, Daniel Olivera | UTUTO dev team | 2000 | XS 2012 | ? | 2012-04-27 | 100% Free: GNU FSDG | Ututo XS: Gentoo Linux, Ututo UL: Ubuntu | general | None | Inactive |
| VectorLinux | Robert S. Lange | dev team | 1999 | | ? | | X | Slackware | desktop | None | Inactive |
| Void Linux | Juan Romero Pardines | Juan RP and contributors | 2008 | Rolling | Rolling | 2022-10-17 | X | Independent, partially inspired by FreeBSD/NetBSD | general | None | Active |
| Webconverger | Kai Hendry | Webconverger Limited | 2007 | | ? | | X | Debian | kiosk software, digital signage | Commercial | Inactive |
| Xandros | Xandros Incorporated | Xandros Incorporated | 2001 | 4.2 | ? | 2007-07-26 | X | Corel Linux | ? | Commercial | Inactive |
| Zentyal | eBox Technologies | eBox Technologies | 2005 | 8.0 | ? | 2024-02-26 | X | Debian, Ubuntu | small business server | Some editions are free of charge | ? |
| Zenwalk | Jean-Philippe Guillemin | dev team | 2004 | current-250116 | ? | 2025-01-16 | X | Slackware | general | None | Active |
| Zorin OS | Zorin Group | Zorin Group | 2009 | 18.1 | ? | 2026-04-15 | X | Ubuntu | general, desktop | Zorin OS Lite & Core are free, while Business and Ultimate are paid | Active |

== Technical ==
The table below shows the default file system, but many Linux distributions support some or all of ext2, ext3, ext4, Btrfs, ReiserFS, Reiser4, JFS, XFS, GFS2, OCFS2, and NILFS. It is possible to install Linux onto most of these file systems. The ext file systems, namely ext2, ext3, and ext4 are based on the original Linux file system.

File systems have been developed by companies to meet their specific needs, by hobbyists, or adapted from Unix, Microsoft Windows, and other operating systems. Linux has full support for XFS and JFS, FAT (the DOS file system), and HFS, the main file system for the Macintosh. Support for Microsoft Windows NT's NTFS file system has been developed and is now comparable with other native Unix file systems. CDs, DVDs, and Blu-ray discs' ISO 9660 and Universal Disk Format (UDF) are supported.

Unlike other operating systems, Linux and Unix allow any file system regardless of the medium it is stored on, whether that medium is a magnetic disk, an optical disk (CD, DVD, etc.), a USB flash memory key, or even contained within a file located on another file system. Similarly, many C compilers (mainly GNU Compiler Collection (GCC)), init systems (mainly sysvinit), desktop environments and window managers are widely supported.

| Distribution | Default Linux kernel | Default file system | Default init system | Install-time desktop environment or window manager selection | Reproducible builds |
|---|---|---|---|---|---|
| Alpine Linux | Binary blobs | ext4 | openrc | none | In progress |
| ALT Linux | Binary blobs | ext3 | systemd | KDE Plasma Workspaces, Xfce | No |
| Arch Linux | Binary blobs | none | systemd | Awesome, bspwm, Budgie, Cinnamon, COSMIC, CuteFish, Deepin, Enlightenment, GNOME, Hyprland, i3, KDE, LXQt, MATE, Qtile, Sway, Xfce | In progress |
| BLAG | Linux-libre | ext3 | sysvinit | GNOME | No |
| Bodhi Linux | Binary blobs | ext4 | systemd | Moksha (Enlightenment fork) | No |
| Canaima | Binary blobs | ? | systemd | GNOME, KDE Plasma and Xfce | No |
| CentOS | Binary blobs | xfs | systemd | GNOME | No |
| Chakra | Binary blobs | ext4 | systemd | KDE Plasma Workspaces | No |
| Chimera Linux | Binary blobs | none | dinit | GNOME, KDE Plasma | No |
| Clear Linux OS | ? | ? | ? | GNOME | |
| ClearOS | Binary blobs | ext3 | systemd | none (Web based) | No |
| CoreOS | Binary blobs | ext4 | systemd | None | No |
| CrunchBang Linux | Binary blobs | ext4 | sysvinit | Openbox | No |
| Damn Small Linux | Binary blobs | ext3 | sysvinit | JWM | No |
| Debian | Linux-libre(debian) with separate non-free binary blobs hosted and sponsored. | ext4 | systemd | GNOME, KDE, Xfce, LXDE | In progress |
| Devuan | Binary blobs | ext4 | sysvinit | Xfce | No |
| Dragora GNU/Linux-Libre | Linux-libre | ext4 | runit | Xfce | No |
| dyne:bolic | Linux-libre | ? | systemd | GNOME | No |
| Fedora | Binary blobs | btrfs | systemd | GNOME (default Workstation Edition), Spins for: KDE, Xfce, Cinnamon, MATE (with Compiz), i3, LXQt, LXDE, Phosh, Sway and Budgie | In progress |
| Funtoo | Binary blobs | none | openrc | None | No |
| Gentoo | Blobs are available, but not added by default. To accept any license considered nonfree through Portage, file edits are needed. | none | openrc | Awesome, Enlightenment, Fluxbox, GNOME, KDE, LXDE-Meta, Openbox, XBMC and Xfce (live DVD) | No |
| gNewSense | Linux-libre(debian), and (unlike Debian) blobs cannot be installed | ext3 | sysvinit | GNOME | No |
| Guix System | Linux-libre, Hurd (in progress) | ext4 | GNU Shepherd | GNOME, Xfce, MATE, Enlightenment, Openbox, awesome, i3, ratpoison, EXWM | Yes |
| Hyperbola GNU/Linux-libre | Linux-libre | none | openrc | none | No |
| IPFire | Binary blobs | ext4 | sysvinit | N/A | No |
| Kali Linux | Binary blobs | ext4 | systemd | GNOME | No |
| Knoppix | Binary blobs | xfs | microknoppix | LXDE | No |
| LibreCMC | Binary blobs | ext4 | busybox-init | none | No |
| Linux Mint | Binary blobs | ext4 | systemd | MATE, Cinnamon, KDE 4, XFCE | No |
| Mageia | Binary blobs | ext4 | systemd | KDE Plasma Workspaces, GNOME | No |
| Mandriva Linux | Binary blobs | ext4 | systemd | KDE Plasma Workspaces | No |
| Manjaro Linux | Binary blobs | none | systemd | Xfce, KDE, GNOME | No |
| MEPIS | Binary blobs | ext4 | sysvinit | KDE Plasma Workspaces | No |
| Miracle Linux | Binary blobs | ext4 | systemd | GNOME | No |
| Musix GNU+Linux | Linux-libre | ext4 | initscripts | LXDE | No |
| MX Linux | Binary blobs | ext4 | sysvinit | Fluxbox, KDE and Xfce | No |
| NixOS | Binary blobs or Linux-libre | none | systemd | GNOME or KDE Plasma (Default), CDE, Cinnamon, Enlightment, Kodi, Lumina, LXQt, MATE, Pantheon, Phosh, RetroArch, Xfce, Xterm. 40 window managers | In progress |
| OpenELEC | Binary blobs | SquashFS | shell script | XBMC Media Center | No |
| openSUSE | Binary blobs | btrfs | systemd | KDE Plasma Workspaces, GNOME, Xfce | In progress |
| OpenWrt | Binary blobs | overlayfs+SquashFS/JFFS2 | procd | none | In progress |
| Parabola GNU/Linux-libre | Linux-libre | none | openrc or systemd | none | No |
| Pardus | Binary blobs | ext4 | systemd | KDE Plasma Workspaces | No |
| Parsix | Binary blobs | ext4 | systemd | GNOME | No |
| PCLinuxOS | Binary blobs | none | sysvinit | KDE Plasma Workspaces, GNOME, LXDE, Xfce, Enlightenment, Openbox | No |
| Pentoo | Binary blobs | SquashFS | openrc | Enlightenment | No |
| Porteus | Binary blobs | ? | sysvinit | KDE, LXDE, Xfce, Openbox, Razor-qt | No |
| Puppy Linux | Binary blobs | SquashFS containing ext2 | busybox-init | JWM | No |
| PureOS | Linux-libre(debian). Binary blobs are not hosted and discouraged while can be manually installed. | ext4 | systemd | GNOME | No |
| Red Hat Enterprise Linux | Binary blobs | xfs | systemd | GNOME | No |
| Rxart Desktop | Binary blobs | ext3 | ? | KDE Plasma Workspaces | No |
| Sabayon Linux | Binary blobs | ext4 | systemd | KDE Plasma Workspaces, GNOME | No |
| Scientific Linux | Binary blobs | ext4 | sysvinit, systemd | GNOME | No |
| Slackware | Binary blobs | ? | RC.d and sysvinit compatible | KDE, XFCE Fluxbox, Blackbox, fvwm2 twm | No |
| Slax | Binary blobs | SquashFS | sysvinit | KDE Plasma Workspaces | No |
| SliTaz GNU/Linux | Binary blobs | ext3 | busybox-init | Openbox | No |
| Solus | Binary blobs | ext4 | systemd | Budgie, Gnome, MATE, KDE | No |
| Source Mage GNU/Linux | Binary blobs | ext2 | simpleinit-msb | none | No |
| SteamOS | Binary blobs | btrfs, ext4 | systemd | Steam, KDE Plasma | No |
| SUSE Linux Enterprise Desktop | Binary blobs | btrfs | systemd | GNOME | No |
| Tails | Vanilla Linux | ? | systemd | GNOME | Reproducible ISO and USB images |
| Trisquel | Linux-libre | ? | systemd | MATE | No |
| TurnKey GNU/Linux | Binary blobs | ext4 | systemd | none - headless server by design; provides Webmin for administration | No |
| Ubuntu–Edubuntu | Binary blobs | ext4 | systemd | GNOME | No |
| Ubuntu GNOME | Binary blobs | ext4 | systemd | GNOME 3 | No |
| Ubuntu MATE | Binary blobs | ext4 | systemd | MATE | No |
| Kubuntu | Binary blobs | ext4 | systemd | KDE Plasma Workspaces | No |
| Xubuntu | Binary blobs | ext4 | systemd | Xfce | No |
| Lubuntu | Binary blobs | ext4 | systemd | LXQt | No |
| Ututo | Ututo XS (stable) is de-blobbed with Linux-libre tools. Ututo UL (development) uses Linux-libre. Ututo UL means "Ubuntu-Libre" | ext3 | systemd | GNOME | No |
| VectorLinux | Binary blobs | ReiserFS | sysvinit | KDE, Openbox, Fluxbox, IceWM, Xfce | No |
| Void Linux | Binary blobs | none | runit | none | No |
| Webconverger | Binary blobs | gitfs | sysvinit | dwm enforcing a Browser-only interface | No |
| XBMC Live | Binary blobs | ext3 | systemd | XBMC Media Center | No |
| Zentyal | Binary blobs | ext4 | systemd | LXDE | No |
| Zenwalk | Binary blobs | ext4 | sysvinit | Xfce | No |

== Instruction set architecture support ==
Linux kernel portability to instruction set architectures other than x86, was an early feature added to the kernel.

| Distribution | x86 | x86-64 | arm | ia64 | ppc | ppc64 | sparc32 | sparc64 | hppa | loongarch64 | mips | sh | s390 | s390x | alpha | m68k | riscv |
|---|---|---|---|---|---|---|---|---|---|---|---|---|---|---|---|---|---|
| Alpine Linux | Yes | Yes | Yes | No | No | Yes | No | No | No | Yes | No | No | No | Yes | No | No | riscv64 3.20+ |
| Arch Linux | Unofficial; Official discontinued 2017-11-08 | Yes | Unofficial | No | Discontinued unofficial port, Unofficial | Unofficial | No | No | No | Unofficial | No | No | No | No | No | No | Unofficial |
| BackTrack | Discontinued from BackTrack 5 and superseded by Kali Linux | Discontinued from BackTrack 5 and superseded by Kali Linux | Discontinued from BackTrack 5 and superseded by Kali Linux | No | No | No | No | No | No | No | No | No | No | No | No | No | No |
| BLAG | Yes | Yes | No | No | No | No | No | No | No | No | No | No | No | No | No | No | No |
| Bodhi Linux | Legacy branch only | Yes | Discontinued; 2013-10-23 | No | No | No | No | No | No | No | No | No | No | No | No | No | No |
| BOSS Linux | Yes | Yes | ? | No | Yes | Yes | No | No | No | No | No | No | No | No | No | No | No |
| CentOS | AltArch | Yes | AltArch | Discontinued; 3.5-3.8; 4.1-4.7 | Beta, Discontinued; 4.0 | AltArch | Beta; 4.2 | No | No | No | No | No | Discontinued; 3.5-3.8; 4.1-4.7 | Discontinued; 3.5-3.8; 4.1-4.7 | Discontinued; 4.2-4.3 | No | No |
| Chakra | No | Yes | ? | No | No | No | No | No | No | No | No | No | No | No | No | No | No |
| Chimera Linux | No | Yes | Yes | No | No | Yes | No | No | No | Yes | No | No | No | No | No | No | Yes |
| Clear Linux OS | ? | Yes | ? | ? | No | No | No | No | No | No | No | No | No | No | No | No | No |
| CRUX | Yes | Yes | No | No | No | No | No | No | No | No | No | No | No | No | No | No | No |
| Debian | Discontinued; 1.1-12.15 | Yes; 4.0+ | Yes; 2.2+ | Discontinued; 3.0-7.0 | Discontinued; 2.2-8 | Yes | Discontinued; 2.1-4.0 | Discontinued -7 | Discontinued; 3.0-5.0 | Official port requested | Discontinued; 3.0-12.15 | In progress | Discontinued; 3.0-7 | Yes; 7+ | Discontinued; 2.1-5.0 | Discontinued; 2.0-3.1 | Officially testing |
| Devuan | Discontinued; 6.0 | Yes | Yes | No | No | No | No | No | No | No | No | No | No | No | No | No | No |
| Dragora GNU/Linux-Libre | Yes | Yes | No | No | No | No | No | No | No | No | No | No | No | No | No | No | No |
| dyne:bolic | Yes | No | No | No | No | No | No | No | No | No | No | No | No | No | No | No | No |
| Fedora | Discontinued from Fedora 30 | Yes | Yes | Discontinued from Fedora 9 | Discontinued from Fedora 17 | Yes | No | Inactive from Fedora 12 | No | In progress | Inactive from Fedora 13 | No | No | Yes | No | No | In progress |
| Finnix | Discontinued; 110 | Yes | No | No | Discontinued; 110 | Discontinued; 110 | No | No | No | No | No | No | No | No | No | No | No |
| Gentoo | Yes | Yes | Yes | Discontinued 2024-08-14 | Yes | Yes | Yes | Yes | Yes | Yes | Yes | Yes | Yes | Yes | Yes | Yes | Yes |
| gNewSense | Yes | Yes | No | No | No | No | No | No | No | No | Yes | No | No | No | No | No | No |
| Guix System | Yes | Yes | Yes, ARMv7 and AArch64 | No | No | No | No | No | No | No | No | No | No | No | No | No | In progress |
| Hyperbola GNU/Linux-libre | Yes | Yes | No | No | No | In progress | No | No | No | No | No | No | No | No | No | No | In progress |
| IPFire | Discontinued in 2021 | Yes | Yes | No | No | No | No | No | No | No | No | No | No | No | No | No | Under Development |
| Kali Linux | Discontinued; 2024.4 | Yes | Yes | No | No | No | No | No | No | No | No | No | No | No | No | No | No |
| LibreCMC | No | No | No | No | No | No | No | No | No | No | Yes XBurst | No | No | No | No | No | No |
| Manjaro Linux | Unofficial | Yes | Yes | No | No | No | No | No | No | No | No | No | No | No | No | No | No |
| MEPIS | Yes | Yes | Yes | No | No | No | No | No | No | No | No | No | No | No | No | No | No |
| Miracle Linux | Discontinued; 8.0 | Yes | No | No | No | No | No | No | No | No | No | No | No | No | No | No | No |
| Musix GNU+Linux | Yes | No | No | No | No | No | No | No | No | No | No | No | No | No | No | No | No |
| MX Linux | Discontinued; 25 | Yes | Yes | No | No | No | No | No | No | No | No | No | No | No | No | No | No |
| NixOS | Unofficial | Yes | Yes | No | Unofficial | Unofficial | No | No | No | No | No | No | Unofficial | Unofficial | No | Unofficial | Unofficial |
| OpenELEC | Yes | Yes | Yes | No | No | No | No | No | No | No | No | No | No | No | No | No | No |
| openSUSE Leap | No | Yes | v7 64 | No | No | ppc64le | No | No | No | No | No | No | No | No | No | No | No |
| openSUSE Tumbleweed | Yes | Yes | v6 v7 64 | No | No | Yes | No | No | No | No | No | No | No | Yes | No | No | RV64G |
| OpenWrt | Yes | Yes | Yes | No | Yes | No | No | No | No | No | Yes | Yes | No | No | No | No | No |
| Oracle Linux | Discontinued; 7.0 | Yes | No | Discontinued; 5 | No | No | No | No | No | No | No | No | No | No | No | No | No |
| Parabola GNU/Linux-libre | Yes | Yes | Yes, ARMv7 | No | No | Test release | No | No | No | No | Discontinued | No | No | No | No | No | Test release |
| Red Flag Linux | Discontinued; 8.0 | Discontinued; 8.0 | No | Discontinued; 3 | No | Discontinued; 3 | No | No | No | No | No | No | No | No | No | No | No |
| Red Hat Linux | Discontinued; 9.0 | No | No | Discontinued; 7.1-7.2 | Test release 5.1 | No | Discontinued; 4.0-4.2; 5.1-6.2 | Test release 5.1 | No | No | Test release 5.1 | No | Discontinued; 7.2 | Yes | Discontinued; 2.1-7.1 | Test release 5.1 | No |
| Red Hat Enterprise Linux | Discontinued; 2.1-6 | Yes; 3+ | Yes | Discontinued; 2.1-5 | Yes; 3+ | Yes; 3+ | No | No | No | No | No | No | Discontinued; 3-4 | Yes; 3+ | No | No | No |
| Sabayon Linux | Discontinued | Yes | No | No | No | No | No | No | No | No | No | No | No | No | No | No | No |
| Scientific Linux | Yes | Yes | No | Discontinued; 3-4 | No | No | No | No | No | No | No | No | No | No | No | No | No |
| SHR | No | No | Yes | No | No | No | No | No | No | No | No | No | No | No | No | No | No |
| Slackware | Yes | Yes | Yes | No | No | No | Discontinued ? | No | No | No | No | No | Discontinued ? | Discontinued ? | Discontinued; 8.1 | No | No |
| Solus | No | Yes | No | No | No | No | No | No | No | No | No | No | No | No | No | No | No |
| Source Mage GNU/Linux | Yes | Yes | No | No | Yes | No | No | No | No | ? | No | No | No | No | No | No | No |
| SUSE Linux Enterprise Server | Yes | Yes | AArch64 only | Yes | Yes | Yes | No | No | No | No | No | No | No | Yes | No | No | No |
| Trisquel GNU/Linux | Discontinued; 10.0 | Yes | No | No | No | No | No | No | No | No | No | No | No | No | No | No | No |
| TurnKey GNU/Linux | Selected ISOs available | Yes | No - but under development by community | No | No | No | No | No | No | No | No | No | No | No | No | No | No |
| Ubuntu, Kubuntu, Xubuntu, Lubuntu | Discontinued from Ubuntu 20.04 | Yes | Yes, including 64-bit ARMv8-A | No | Yes | Yes | No | No | No | No | No | No | No | Ubuntu only, 16.04+ | No | No | No |
| Ututo | Yes | Yes | No | No | No | No | No | No | No | In progress | No | No | No | No | No | No | No |
| Void Linux | Yes | Yes | Yes | No | Unofficial | Unofficial | No | No | No | No | No | No | No | No | No | No | No |
| XBMCbuntu | Yes | No | Yes | No | No | No | No | No | No | No | No | No | No | No | No | No | No |
| Yellow Dog Linux | No | No | No | No | Yes | Yes | No | No | No | No | No | No | No | No | No | No | No |

== Package management and installation ==
Information on features in the distributions. Package numbers are only approximate. Some distributions like Debian tend to separate tools into different packages – usually stable release, development release, documentation and debug. Also counting the source package number varies. For Debian and RPM Package Manager (RPM) based entries it is just the base to produce binary packages, so the total number of packages is the number of binary packages. For Arch based entries, it is additional.

| Distribution | Free software repositories | Approximate number of pre-compiled packages | Approximate number of source packages | Default package management tool(s) | Package format | Default installer | Graphical installation process | Netinstall | Netboot |
|---|---|---|---|---|---|---|---|---|---|
| Alpine Linux | Free, and nonfree | 13,888 | ? | apk | .apk | setup-alpine | No | ? | iPXE |
| ALT Linux | Free, and nonfree | 8,300 | ? | APT (APT-RPM), RPM | RPM | | Yes | ? | ? |
| Arch Linux | Free, and nonfree | 15,685 | 107,820 from AUR | Pacman | .pkg.tar.zst | arch-install-scripts and archinstaller | No | Yes | iPXE |
| BLAG | Free only | 10,000 | ? | RPM, yum, APT | RPM | | Yes | No | No |
| Bodhi Linux | Free, and nonfree | (Note: Based on Debian) | ? | APT | .dpkg | Ubiquity | Yes | ? | ? |
| Canaima | Free, and nonfree | ? | ? | APT | .deb | debian-installer | Yes | ? | ? |
| CentOS | Free, and nonfree | 6,813 (Note: Based on Fedora) | ? | RPM, yum/up2date | RPM | Anaconda | Yes | Yes | ? |
| Chakra | Free, and nonfree | 3,074 | CCR: 5,342 | Pacman (to be replaced by Akabei in future) | .pkg.tar.xz | | Package manager in development | ? | ? |
| Chimera Linux | Free, and nonfree | 12,826 | 2,648 | apk | .apk | None | No | Yes | No |
| ClearOS | Free, and nonfree | (Note: Based on Fedora) | ? | RPM, yum | RPM | | No | ? | ? |
| Clear Linux OS | ? | ? | ? | Swupd | ? | ? | ? | ? | ? |
| CrunchBang Linux | Free, and nonfree | (Note: Based on Debian) | ? | APT | .deb | | Yes | ? | ? |
| Debian | Free, and nonfree | 171,937 | 28,923 (Note: From the Sources.gz files in the main, contrib and non-free sections of Debian Buster. On the 2020-06-12, Debian Sid, the development release, have 31717 source packages.) | APT | .deb | Debian-Installer | Yes | Yes | PXE |
| Devuan | Free, and nonfree | (Note: Based on Debian) | ? | APT | .deb | Debian-Installer | Yes | Yes | PXE |
| Dragora GNU/Linux-Libre | Free only | 484 | ? | pkgsystem | .tlz | ? | No | No | No |
| dyne:bolic | Free only | ? | ? | APT | .deb | Debian-Installer | Yes | No | No |
| Fedora | Free, and nonfree | 68,419 | 41,996 | DNF, yum, PackageKit | RPM | Anaconda | Yes | Yes | ? |
| Gentoo | Free, and nonfree | 118 | 19,105 (Note: Note this number is just of packages in the Official Gentoo Overlay (or Portage Tree). Several hundred other packages are available from other overlays) | Portage | .ebuild, .tbz2 | None (third-party install scripts only) | Yes (Note: Can be installed graphically (GTK+ and ncurses), but traditionally done by command line (install cd, live cd, netboot, and from distributions).) | Yes | PXE |
| gNewSense | Free only | ? | ? | APT | .deb | Debian-Installer | Yes | Yes | No |
| Guix System | Free only | 20,571 | 20,571 | Guix | .scm, .go | guix system init | Yes | Yes | No |
| Hyperbola GNU/Linux-libre | Free only | 6,128 | ? | Pacman | .pkg.tar.lz | None (third-party install scripts only) | No | Yes | ? |
| IPFire | Free, and nonfree | ? | ? | pakfire | custom format | IPFire installer | No | No | Yes |
| Knoppix | Free, and nonfree | (Note: Based on Debian) | ? | APT | .deb | | No | ? | ? |
| LibreCMC | Free only | 826 | ? | ? | ? | | No | No | No |
| Linux Mint | Free, and nonfree | (Note: Based on Debian) | ? | APT | .deb | Ubiquity | Yes | ? | ? |
| Mageia | Free, and nonfree | 17,283 (i586), 11,409 (x86-64) | 8,834 | urpmi, rpmdrake | RPM | DrakX | Yes | Yes | ? |
| Mandriva Linux | Free, and nonfree | 22,600 | ? | urpmi, rpmdrake | RPM | DrakX | Yes | ? | ? |
| Manjaro Linux | Free, and nonfree | ? | (Note: Based on AUR) | Pacman | .pkg.tar.xz | Calamares | Yes | Yes | iPXE |
| MEPIS | Free, and nonfree | (Note: Based on Debian) | ? | APT | .deb | MEPIS Install | Yes | ? | ? |
| Miracle Linux | Free, and nonfree | 7,109 | 2,899 | RPM, yum, dnf | RPM | Anaconda | Yes | Yes | No |
| Musix GNU+Linux | Free only | 1,819 | ? | APT | .deb | Debian-Installer | Yes | No | No |
| MX Linux | Free, and nonfree | (Note: Based on Debian) | ? | APT | .deb | Gazelle Installer | Yes | No | No |
| NixOS | Free, and nonfree | 129,926 | 124,166 | nix | .nix | Calamares | Yes | Yes | Yes |
| OpenELEC | Free, and nonfree | 140 | ? | XBMCbuntu addon manager, own and 3rd party addons | .zip | | Yes | ? | ? |
| openSUSE | Free, and nonfree | 42,236 with PackMan | 34,000 | YaST, Zypper | RPM | YaST | Yes | Yes | ? |
| OpenWrt | Free, and nonfree | 2,000 | ? | opkg | .ipk | - | No | ? | ? |
| Parabola GNU/Linux-libre | Free only | 23,000 | ? | Pacman | .pkg.tar.xz | None (third-party install scripts only) or Calamares | Yes | Yes | ? |
| Pardus | Free, and nonfree | 4,000 | ? | APT | .deb | Debian-Installer | Yes | ? | ? |
| Parsix | Free, and nonfree | (Note: Based on Debian) | 14,900 | APT | .deb | | Yes | ? | ? |
| PCLinuxOS | Free, and nonfree | 12,000 | ? | APT, RPM | RPM | | Yes | ? | ? |
| Puppy | Free, and nonfree | 700 | ? | PupGet, DotPup | .pup, .pet | | Yes | ? | ? |
| Red Hat Enterprise Linux | Free, and nonfree | 3,000 (plus 9,155 from EPEL) | ? | RPM, yum | RPM | Anaconda | Yes | ? | ? |
| Rxart | Free, and nonfree | (Note: Based on Debian) | ? | APT | .deb | | Yes | ? | ? |
| Sabayon Linux | Free, and nonfree | (Note: Based on Gentoo) | ? | Portage, Entropy | ebuild, .tbz2 | Calamares | Yes | ? | ? |
| Scientific | Free, and nonfree | (Note: Based on Fedora) | ? | APT/yum | RPM | | Yes | ? | ? |
| Slackware | Free, and nonfree | 2,292 | 7,705 from SlackBuilds | slackpkg | tgz, .txz, .tlz, .tbz | bash script | No | Yes | Yes |
| Slax | Free, and nonfree | 2,050 | ? | none | .lzm | | | ? | ? |
| SliTaz GNU/Linux | Free, and nonfree | 3,381 | ? | Tazpkg | .tazpkg | tazinst | Yes | iPXE | iPXE |
| Solus | Free, and nonfree | 9,500 | ? | eopkg | .eopkg | os-installer | Yes | No | No |
| Source Mage GNU/Linux | Free, and nonfree | 118 | 8,876 | Sorcery Package Manager | src | | Yes | ? | ? |
| SUSE Linux | Free, and nonfree | 24,094 | 11,385 | YaST, Zypper | RPM | YaST | Yes | ? | ? |
| Tiny Core Linux | Free, and nonfree | 25,160 | ? | ab, tce-load | tcz | tc-install, core2usb | Yes | ? | ? |
| Tiny SliTaz | Free, and nonfree | 50 | ? | Web site | tazpkg | | No | ? | iPXE |
| Trisquel | Free only | 52,748 | ? | APT | .deb | Ubiquity | Yes | Yes | ? |
| TurnKey GNU/Linux | Free, and nonfree | (Note: Based on Debian) (plus ≈30 custom packages) | 21,041 (Note: From the Sources.gz files in the main, contrib and non-free sections of Debian Jessie. On the 2015-11-21, Debian Sid, the development release, have 24757 source packages.) (currently TurnKey only supplies source code for custom packages) | APT | .deb | DI-Live (custom fork of Debian Installer) | No | No | No |
| Ubuntu, Kubuntu, Xubuntu | Free, and nonfree | 110,066 (Note: Based on Debian) | 24,474 (Note: From the Sources.gz files in the main, universe, multiverse and restricted sections of Ubuntu Wily) | APT | .deb | Ubiquity | Yes | Yes | PXE |
| Ututo | Free only | 5,000 | ? | UTUTO Package Manager | ebuild | ? | ? | No | No |
| Vector Linux | Free, and nonfree | ? | ? | slapt-get, gslapt, installpkg | tgz | | Yes | ? | ? |
| Void Linux | Free, nonfree and multilib | 6,000 | 6,719 | xbps | .xbps | ncurses script | Yes | Yes | No |
| XBMC Live | Free, and nonfree | ? | ? | APT | .deb | | No | ? | ? |
| Zentyal | Free, and nonfree | (Note: Based on Debian) | ? | APT | .deb | dpkg | Yes | ? | ? |
| Zenwalk | Free, and nonfree | 2,000 | ? | netpkg, installpkg, upgradepkg | tgz, txz | | Yes | ? | ? |

== Live media ==
| Distribution | Size of media (MB) | RAM use (MB) | Boots from CD | Boots from DVD | Installable live CD/DVD | Installable from USB |
|---|---|---|---|---|---|---|
| Alpine Linux | 63 (Virtual) 1,019 (Xen) | min 96 GUI 2,048 | Yes | Yes | Yes | Yes |
| Arch Linux | 742 | min 80 | Yes | Yes | Yes | Yes |
| AUSTRUMI | 426 | | Yes | Yes | Yes | Yes |
| BLAG Linux and GNU | 696 | ? | Yes | No | ? | |
| Bodhi Linux | 1,024 | 80 | Yes | Yes | Yes | Yes |
| CentOS | 603 (Minimal) 4,096 (DVD) | | Yes | Yes | Yes (installable since 6.0) | Yes |
| Chakra | 2,150 | | No | Yes | Yes | Yes |
| Chimera Linux | 649 to 1,223 | ? | Yes | Yes | Yes | Yes |
| Clear Linux OS | 4,443 | ? | ? | ? | ? | ? |
| Damn Small Linux | 50+ | 24 to 64 | Yes | Yes | Yes | Yes |
| Debian | 1,420 | Up to 2,048 | Yes | Yes | Yes | Yes |
| Devuan | 868 | | Yes | Yes | Yes | Yes |
| Dragora GNU/Linux-Libre | 655 | ? | Yes | ? | ? | ? |
| dyne:bolic | 1,650 | ? | up to version 2.x | Yes | ? | ? |
| Fedora | 1,434 | 256 to 1,024 | Yes | Yes | Yes | Yes |
| Gentoo | 260 (Minimal) 2,048 (Live DVD) | up to 128 | Yes | Yes | Yes | Yes |
| gNewSense | 1,200 | 512 | ? | ? | Yes | ? |
| Grml | 460 | 32 to 128 | Yes | No | Yes | Yes |
| Guix System | 814 | 233 | No | Yes | Yes | Yes |
| Hyperbola GNU/Linux-libre | 1,124 | ? | up to version 0.3.x | Yes | Yes | Yes |
| IPFire | ≈650 | ≈512 | Yes | Yes | No | Yes |
| Knoppix CD | 700 | 128 to 320 | Yes | Yes | Only DVD edition is maintained | |
| Knoppix DVD | 4,813 | 128 to 500 | No | Yes | | |
| LibreCMC | ? | ? | No | No | No | No |
| Mandriva Linux One | 700 | 128 to 768 | Yes | Yes | Yes | Yes |
| Manjaro Linux | 473 to 2,200 | 256 to 1,024 | Yes | Yes | Yes | Yes |
| MEPIS | 700 to 4,000 | 128 to 512 | Yes | Yes | Yes | Yes |
| Musix GNU+Linux | 2,000 | ? | No | Yes | Yes | Yes |
| MX Linux | 1,600 to 2,700 | 512 to 1,024 | No | Yes | Yes | Yes |
| Nanolinux | 18 | ≈64 | Yes | Yes | Yes | Yes |
| NixOS | 780 (Minimal) 1,700 (Plasma) 2,200 (GNOME) | ? | Yes | Yes | Yes | Yes |
| openGEU | 700 | 192 to 512 | Yes | | Yes | |
| openSUSE (Not 42.1) | 700 | 128 to 768 | Yes | Yes | Yes | Yes |
| OpenWrt | min 4 | min 16 | No | No | No | No |
| Parabola GNU/Linux-libre | 400 to 3,300 | ? | Yes | Yes | Yes | Yes |
| Pardus | 1,256 to 1,276 | 256 to 1,024 | Yes | Yes | Yes | Yes |
| PCLinuxOS | 130 to 700 | 96 to 512 | Yes | Yes | Yes | Yes |
| Pentoo | 666 and 700 | 48 to 96 | Yes | Yes | By hand | By hand |
| Porteus | 224 to 373 | min 36 | ? | ? | Yes | Yes |
| Puppy Linux (Slacko) | 235 | 32 to 192 | Yes | Yes | Yes | Yes |
| Puredyne | 542 | | Yes | Yes | Yes | Yes |
| Sabayon Linux Live CD | 695 | | Yes | Yes | Yes | Yes |
| Sabayon Linux Live DVD | 2,400 | | No | Yes | Yes | Yes |
| Scientific Linux | 431 to 2,300 | 640 | Yes | Yes | Yes | Yes |
| Slackware | 2,600 | 64 to 1,024 | Yes | Yes | Yes | Yes |
| Slax | 200 | 96 to 320 | Yes | Yes | | Yes |
| Solus | 1,200 | 1,024 | No | Yes | Yes | Yes |
| SystemRescueCD | 459 | | Yes | Yes | Yes | Yes |
| SliTaz GNU/Linux | 50 | 48 to 256 | Yes | Yes | Yes | Yes |
| Tails | ≈900 | ≈1,024 | No | Yes | Yes | Yes (when run from DVD) |
| Tiny Core Linux | 17 (Core) 248 (Core Plus) | 28 to 128 | Yes | Yes | Yes | Yes |
| Tiny SliTaz | 1.44 | 4 | Yes | Yes | By SliTaz | By SliTaz |
| Trisquel | 1,500 | 384 | Yes | Yes | Yes | Yes |
| TurnKey GNU/Linux Core (base) appliance ISO | 212 | ~173 | Yes | Yes | Yes | Yes |
| Ubuntu | 1,700 | 384 | Yes | Yes | Yes | Yes |
| Edubuntu | 2,900 | | Yes | Yes | Yes | |
| Kubuntu | 1,400 | 384 | Yes | Yes | Yes | Yes |
| Xubuntu | 1,200 | 256 | Yes | Yes | Yes | Yes |
| Ututo | 3,500 | ? | No | Yes | Yes | ? |
| XBMC Live | 700 | 256 to 1,024 | Yes | No | Yes | Yes |
| Zentyal | 600 | 256 | Yes | Yes | Yes | Yes |

== Security features ==
| Distribution | Compile time buffer checks | Mandatory access control | Software executable-space protection | grsecurity | RSBAC |
|---|---|---|---|---|---|
| Alpine Linux | Yes | Unknown | PaX | Discontinued in 3.8.0 | Unknown |
| Arch Linux | Unknown | SELinux (Unofficial),AppArmor | Unknown | Unknown | Unknown |
| BLAG | Unknown | Unknown | Unknown | Unknown | Unknown |
| Android (operating system) | Yes | SELinux (since Android Marshmallow) | Optional | Optional | Optional |
| Clear Linux OS | Unknown | Unknown | Unknown | Unknown | Unknown |
| Debian | Yes | SELinux, AppArmor | PaX optional | Optional | Optional |
| Dragora GNU/Linux-Libre | Unknown | Unknown | Unknown | Unknown | Unknown |
| dyne:bolic | Unknown | Unknown | Unknown | Unknown | Unknown |
| Fedora | Yes | SELinux | Exec Shield | No | No |
| Gentoo | Optional | SELinux, AppArmor | PaX optional | Optional | Optional |
| gNewSense | Unknown | SELinux, AppArmor (Note: Based on Debian) | Unknown | Unknown | Unknown |
| Guix System | Unknown | Unknown | Unknown | Unknown | Unknown |
| IPFire | Yes | No | No | Discontinued in 2018 | No |
| LibreCMC | Unknown | Unknown | Unknown | Unknown | Unknown |
| Mandriva | Unknown | AppArmor | Unknown | Unknown | Yes |
| Miracle Linux | Unknown | SELinux | Unknown | No | Unknown |
| Musix GNU+Linux | Unknown | Unknown | Unknown | Unknown | Unknown |
| Parabola GNU/Linux-libre | Unknown | Optional | Unknown | Optional | Unknown |
| Slackware | Unknown | AppArmor, tomoyo | Unknown | Unknown | Optional |
| SUSE Linux | Yes | AppArmor | Hardware NX and other methods in mainline kernel and toolchain | No | No |
| Solus | Yes | AppArmor | Unknown | No | Unknown |
| Trisquel | Unknown | SELinux, AppArmor (Note: Based on Ubuntu) | Unknown | Unknown | Unknown |
| Ubuntu | Yes | SELinux, AppArmor | PaX optional | Optional | Optional |
| Ututo | Unknown | Unknown | Unknown | Unknown | Unknown |

== Apple Silicon support ==
| Distribution | Direct install | Working virtualisation | Community version |
|---|---|---|---|
| Kali | Unknown | Yes | —N/a |
| Ubuntu | Unknown | Yes | —N/a |
| Fedora | Unknown | Yes | —N/a |
| Red Hat | Unknown | Yes | —N/a |

== See also ==
- Comparison of netbook-oriented Linux distributions
- Comparison of operating systems
- DistroWatch
- List of Linux distributions
