= Libre manifesto =

A libre manifesto is a concise statement of values and intent shared by members of a community concerned with the development and sharing of libre resources. The values reflect those of the free/libre software movement and the community behind the manifesto typically engages in activism towards a libre society.

== Libre manifestos ==
Libre communities include and were inspired by the free software movement which values and emphasises ethics over pragmatics (favoured by proponents of open source software).

While valuing both but with a tendency to emphasise ethics and social solidarity over the pragmatics highlighted by open source, libre communities have from time to time released manifestos declaring their views, motives and intentions. Examples include the GNU Manifesto, the Mozilla Manifesto, the Debian Social Contract and guidelines, and others from the libre software community, The Libre Society Manifesto, Hipatia's First and 2nd Manifestos, the Libre Communities Manifesto and Declaration relating to libre knowledge.

== Common features ==
Underpinning these declarations is a rejection of the dominant model encoded in the legal system which treats digital works as if they were ownable physical objects. All express concern about the power of organisations and authorities to restrict access to and control the use of non-rivalrous digital cultural and knowledge resources through the prevailing legal system. They expound the value of universal access, freedom and sharing in bringing about a better world by empowering people to participate. Where intentions and actions are stated, these generally involve educating society on the value of this type of freedom and developing libre resources and tools for editing and sharing them.

== See also ==
- The Libre Society Manifesto
