= BLAG Linux and GNU =

Linux distribution

BLAG
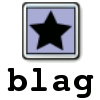

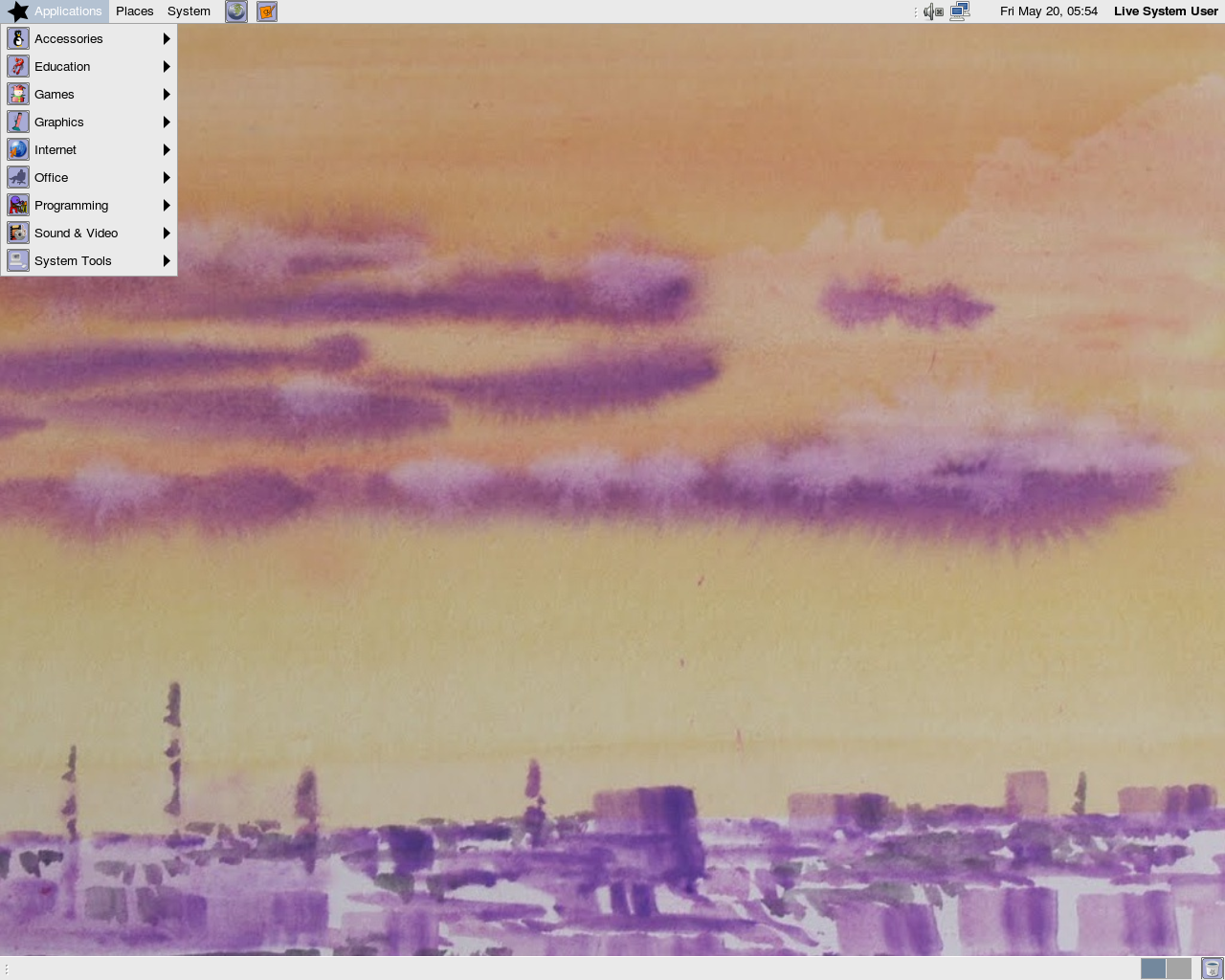
- Developer: Brixton Linux Action Group
- OS family: Linux (Unix-like)
- Working state: Discontinued
- Initial release: 2002; 24 years ago
- Latest release: 140000 / May 4, 2011; 15 years ago
- Latest preview: 240000
- Update method: rolling release
- Package manager: dnf
- Kernel type: Monolithic (Linux-libre)
- Userland: GNU
- Default user interface: GNOME (was planned to have switched to MATE upon release of BLAG 240000)
- License: FSDG
- Official website: www.blagblagblag.org

BLAG Linux and GNU is a discontinued Linux distribution that was made by the Brixton Linux Action Group.

BLAG was a single-CD distro with a range of default desktop applications, including multimedia, graphics, desktop internet applications and more. BLAG also included a collection of server packages. BLAG was based on Fedora plus updates, added apps from Dag, Dries, Freshrpms, NewRPMS, and includes custom packages.

BLAG was one of the few operating systems listed as a completely free software distribution by the Free Software Foundation.

== History ==
The first public release of BLAG was 22 October 2002. The latest stable release, BLAG 140k, was based on Fedora 14, and was released on 4 May 2011. In October 2014 BLAG 200000 was released in alpha form.

Planning for BLAG 240000 commenced in January 2016 but it was never released.

The script used in BLAG for cleaning the kernel from non-free blobs shipped in it by default was used as a base for the Linux-libre set of scripts.

== See also ==
- Comparison of Linux distributions
