= Dragora GNU/Linux-Libre =

Linux distribution

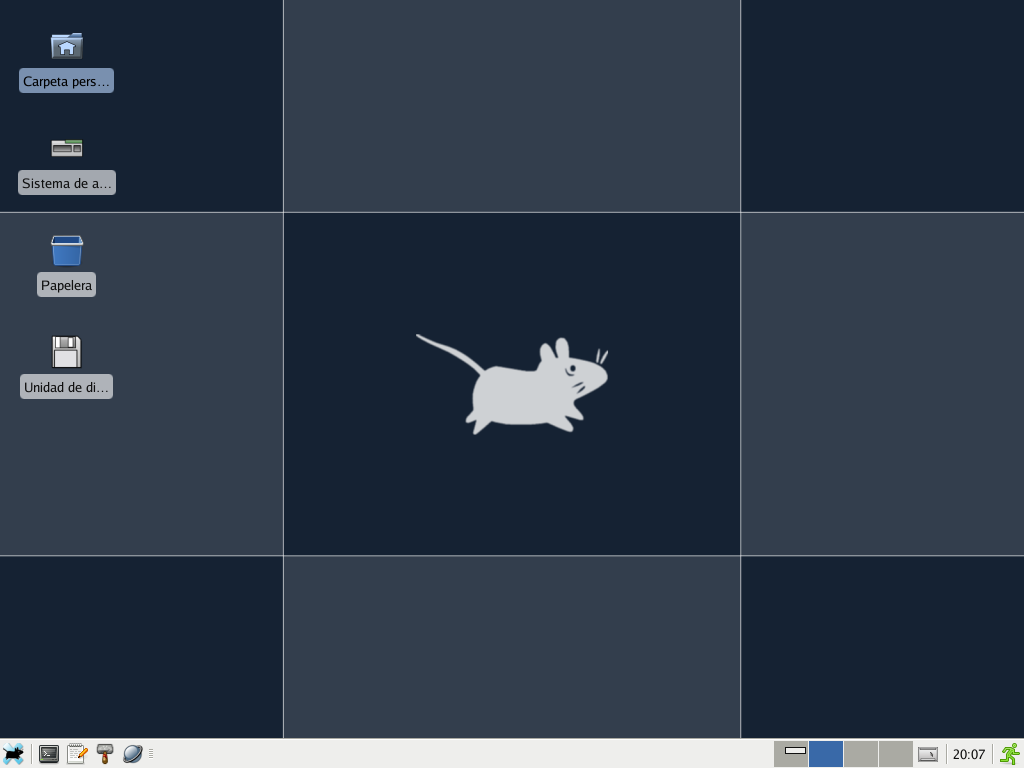
- Dragora GNU/Linux-Libre with Xfce
- Developer: Matías A. Fonzo
- OS family: Unix-like (Linux kernel)
- Working state: Dormant as of 2025-12-03 15:28 UTC or Discontinued
- Initial release: March 13, 2009; 17 years ago
- Latest release: 3.0-beta2 / 26 April 2023; 3 years ago
- Repository: repo = https://git.savannah.nongnu.org/git/dragora.git for source code https://sourceforge.net/projects/dragora/ for iso files
- Package manager: Qi
- Supported platforms: i586, x86-64
- Kernel type: Monolithic (Linux-libre)
- Userland: GNU
- Default user interface: Xfce
- License: Exclusively free licenses per GNU Free System Distribution Guidelines (GNU FSDG), GPLv3 or later
- Official website: http://www.dragora.org/ Archived July 27, 2024, at the Wayback Machine

Dragora GNU/Linux-Libre is a dormant Argentine Linux distribution written from scratch sharing some similarities with Slackware. It has a simple packaging system that allows installing, removing, upgrading, and creating packages, although the system may be challenging to new users. As it only packages free software and uses the Linux-libre kernel, the Free Software Foundation endorses Dragora. Dragora is considered to be based on the "Keep it simple, stupid" (KISS) principle, believed by the authors to be a strength. In the past, Dragora could be downloaded from its website or purchased on CD

Dragora uses the SysV init system as of 3.0 Beta 2.

== Release dates ==
The following list of releases includes the release dates and the code name used by the project.

- Dragora 1.0 Beta 1: June 13, 2008 - "hell".
- Dragora 1.0 Beta 2: September 18, 2008.
- Dragora 1.0 Release Candidate 1: February 12, 2009.
- Dragora 1.0 Stable: March 13, 2009 - "starlight".
- Dragora 1.1 Release Candidate 1: August 25, 2009.
- Dragora 1.1 Stable: October 8, 2009 - "stargazer".
- Dragora 2.0 Release Candidate 1: January 24, 2010.
- Dragora 2.0 Release Candidate 2: March 28, 2010.
- Dragora 2.0 Stable: April 13, 2010 - "ardi".
- Dragora 2.1 Release Candidate 1: December 4, 2010.
- Dragora 2.1 Stable: December 31, 2010 - "dio".
- Dragora 2.2 Release Candidate 1: March 2, 2012.
- Dragora 2.2 Stable: April 21, 2012 - "rafaela".
- Dragora 3.0 Alpha 1: December 31, 2017.
- Dragora 3.0 Alpha 2: September 28, 2018.
- Dragora 3.0 Beta 1: October 16, 2019.
- Dragora 3.0 Beta 2: April 26, 2023.

== See also ==
- Comparison of Linux distributions
- GNU/Linux naming controversy
