= LibreCMC =

Computer operating system

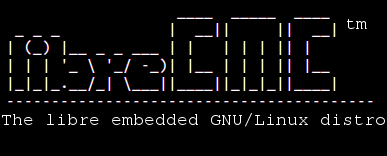
- OS family: Unix-like (Linux kernel)
- Working state: Active
- Initial release: 20 October 2012; 13 years ago
- Latest release: v6.6 / 31 December 2025
- Repository: gogs.librecmc.org/libreCMC/libreCMC.git
- Available in: English
- Supported platforms: MIPS
- Kernel type: Monolithic (Linux-libre)
- Userland: GNU
- License: GPLv2
- Preceded by: LEDE/LibreWRT
- Official website: librecmc.org

LibreCMC is a GNU/Linux-libre distribution for computers with minimal resources, such as the Ben NanoNote, ath9k-based Wi-Fi routers, and other hardware with emphasis on free software. Based on OpenWrt, the project's goal is to aim for compliance with the GNU Free System Distribution Guidelines (GNU FSDG) and ensure that the project continues to meet these requirements set forth by the Free Software Foundation (FSF). LibreCMC does not support ac (Wi-Fi 5) or ax (Wi-Fi 6) due to a lack of free chipsets.

As of 2020, releases do not utilize codenames anymore. The acronym "CMC" in the libreCMC name stands for "Concurrent Machine Cluster".

== History ==
On April 23, 2014, libreCMC's first public release is mentioned in a Trisquel forum. On September 4, 2014, the Free Software Foundation (FSF) added libreCMC to its list of endorsed distributions. Shortly afterwards, on September 12, 2014, the FSF awarded their Respects Your Freedom (RYF) Certification to a new router pre-installed with libreCMC.

On May 2, 2015, libreCMC merged with the LibreWRT project. LibreWRT, initially developed as a case study, was listed by the website prism-break.org as one of the alternatives to proprietary firmware, but today the website lists libreCMC.

On March 10, 2016, the FSF awarded their RYF certification to a new router pre-installed with libreCMC.

On March 29, 2017, libreCMC began its first release based upon the LEDE (Linux Embedded Development Environment) 17.01 codebase.

On January 3, 2020, libreCMC began its first release based upon the OpenWrt 19.07 codebase.

=== Release history ===
- Source

Version	Codename	Codebase	Release	Linux-Libre Kernel Version	Annotation / Improvements
1.2.x	Delusional Dan		2014		First public binary release
1.3.x	Elegant Eleanor		2015		LibreWRT merged to the project, LTS
1.4	Frivolous Fred	LEDE 17.01	29 March 2017		Release based on LEDE
1.4.1			7 October 2017		Fixes various security issues (including dnsmasq and openvpn)
1.4.1a			17 October 2017		Fixes various security issues including: dnsmasq, openvpn and KRACK
1.4.2			1 January 2018	4.4.108	OpenVPN 2.4.4; Openssl-1.0.2n (to fix CVE-2017-3735, CVE-2017-3736); Busybox CVE-2017-16544 fix; curl CVE-2017-8816, CVE-2017-8817 fix; Samba CVE-2017-15275 fix
1.4.3			1 April 2018	4.4.120	openvpn 2.4.5; mbedtls 2.8.0; Tor was moved into base
1.4.4			6 July 2018	4.4.138	openvpn 2.4.6; mbedtls 2.9.0; Various other fixes; Complete removal of references to GitHub repositories
1.4.5			4 October 2018	4.4.159	wireguard 0.0.20181006; Introduced TL-WR1043N v5; Various other fixes
1.4.6			4 Jan 2019	4.4.167	uhttpd 2018-11-28; Wireguard 0.0.20181218; openssl 1.0.2q; mbedtls 2.14.1; Various other fixes
1.4.7			1 April 2019		Fixes CVE 2019-8912; Bump OpenVPN to 2.4.7; Added support for the TPE-R1200
1.4.8			30 June 2019	4.4.183	OpenSSL 1.0.2s; wolfssl 1.15-stable; mbedtls 1.16.1; Wireguard 0.2019.06.01
1.4.9			2 October 2019	4.4.195	OpenSSL 1.0.2t; Tor 0.4.1.6; Wireguard 0.0.20190913
1.5	N/A	OpenWRT 19.07	3 January 2020		ath79 replaces ar71xx targets; tiny sub-target replaces the old legacy images; First release built on Power9 hardware
1.5.0a	N/A		31 January 2020		Fixes CVE-2020-7982; Fixes CVE-2020-7248
1.5.1	N/A		1 April 2020	4.14.173	Updated Wireguard to 1.0.20200330; Updated Tor to 0.4.2.7 to fix CVE-2020-10592 and init script issues; Fixes CVE-2020-8597; Other fixes picked from upstream 19.07.x
1.5.2	N/A		29 June 2020		
1.5.3	N/A		2 October 2020	4.14.199	Updated Wireguard to 1.0.20200908; Added wolfssl support to luci; OpenSSL 1.1.1h; Mbedtls 2.16.8; Other fixes picked from upstream 19.07.x
1.5.4	N/A		31 December 2020	4.14.212	Updated Wireguard to 1.0.20201221; OpenSSL 1.1.1i; OpenVPN 2.4.10; Fixes CVE-2020-28928, CVE-2020-8037; Other fixes picked from upstream 19.07.x
1.5.4a	N/A		24 January 2021	4.14.216	Updated dnsmasq to Addresses critical security issues in dnsmasq to address: CVE-2020-25681, CVE-2020-25682, CVE-2020-25683, CVE-2020-25684, CVE-2020-25685, CVE-2020-25686, and CVE-2020-25687
1.5.5	N/A		1 April 2021	4.14.224	
1.5.7	N/A		1 October 2021	4.14.248	
1.5.8	N/A		21 January 2022	4.14.261	
1.5.9	N/A		4 April 2022	4.14.273	
1.5.10	N/A		28 June 2022	4.14.284	
1.5.12	N/A		24 January 2023	4.14.303	wolfssl 5.5.4-stable; openssl 1.1.1s; Adds support for the TPE-R1400, a rockchip RK3328 based router
1.5.13	N/A		1 April 2023	4.14.311	openssl 1.1.1t; openvpn 2.5.8, which adds wolfssl support
1.5.14	N/A		29 September 2023	4.14.325	openssl 1.1.1w; wolfssl 5.6.3; openvpn 2.5.9; tor 0.4.8.5
1.5.15	N/A		31 December 2023	4.14.334	wolfssl 5.6.6
6.1	N/A		26 August 2024	5.15.164	wolfssl 5.7.2
6.6	N/A		25 December 2025	5.15.164	wolfssl 5.8.4

== List of supported hardware ==
LibreCMC supports the following devices:

Buffalo (Melco subsidiary)

- WZR-HP-G300NH
- WHR-HP-G300NH

Netgear

- WNDR3800: v1.x

TP-Link

- TL-MR3020: v1
- TL-WR741ND: v1 - v2, v4.20 - v4.27
- TL-WR841ND: v5.x, v8.x, v9.x, v10.x, v11.x, v12.x
- TL-WR842ND: v1, v2
- TL-WR1043ND: v1.x, v2.x, v3.x, v4.x, v5.x

ThinkPenguin

- TPE-NWIFIROUTER2
- TPE-R1100
- TPE-R1200
- TPE-R1300
- TPE-R1400

Qi-Hardware

- Ben Nanonote

== See also ==
- Comparison of Linux distributions
- Linksys WRT54G series
- List of router firmware projects
