= Musix GNU+Linux =

Multimedia-oriented Linux distribution

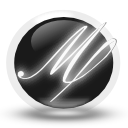

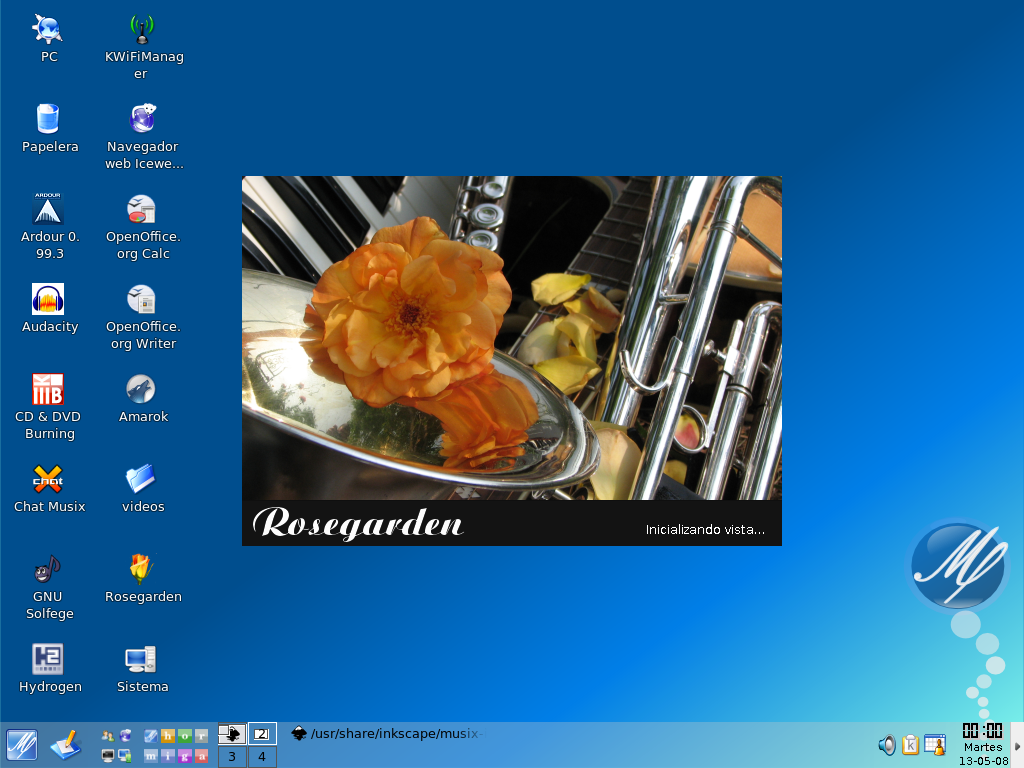
- Musix 1.0 R4 DVD.
- OS family: Linux (Unix-like)
- Working state: Discontinued
- Source model: Free Software
- Initial release: 9 December 2008; 17 years ago
- Latest release: 3.0.1 / 13 March 2014; 12 years ago
- Supported platforms: IA-32
- Kernel type: Monolithic (Linux-libre)
- Userland: GNU
- Default user interface: IceWM (previously KDE)
- License: Exclusively free licenses per GNU Free System Distribution Guidelines (GNU FSDG)
- Official website: musixdistro.wordpress.com

Musix GNU+Linux is a discontinued live CD and DVD Linux distribution for the IA-32 processor family based on Debian. It contained a collection of software for audio production, graphic design, video editing and general-purpose applications.

Musix GNU+Linux was one of the few Linux distributions recognized by the Free Software Foundation as being composed completely of free software.

The main language used in development discussions and documentation was Spanish.

== Software ==
=== Musix 2.0 ===
Musix 2.0 was developed using the live-helper scripts from the Debian-Live project. The first Alpha version of Musix 2.0 was released on 25 March 2009 including two realtime-patched Linux-Libre kernels.

On 17 May 2009 the first beta version of Musix 2.0 was released.

== See also ==
- Comparison of Linux distributions
- dyne:bolic – another free distribution for multimedia enthusiasts
- GNU/Linux naming controversy
- List of Linux distributions based on Debian
