= Chakra (operating system) =

Linux distribution

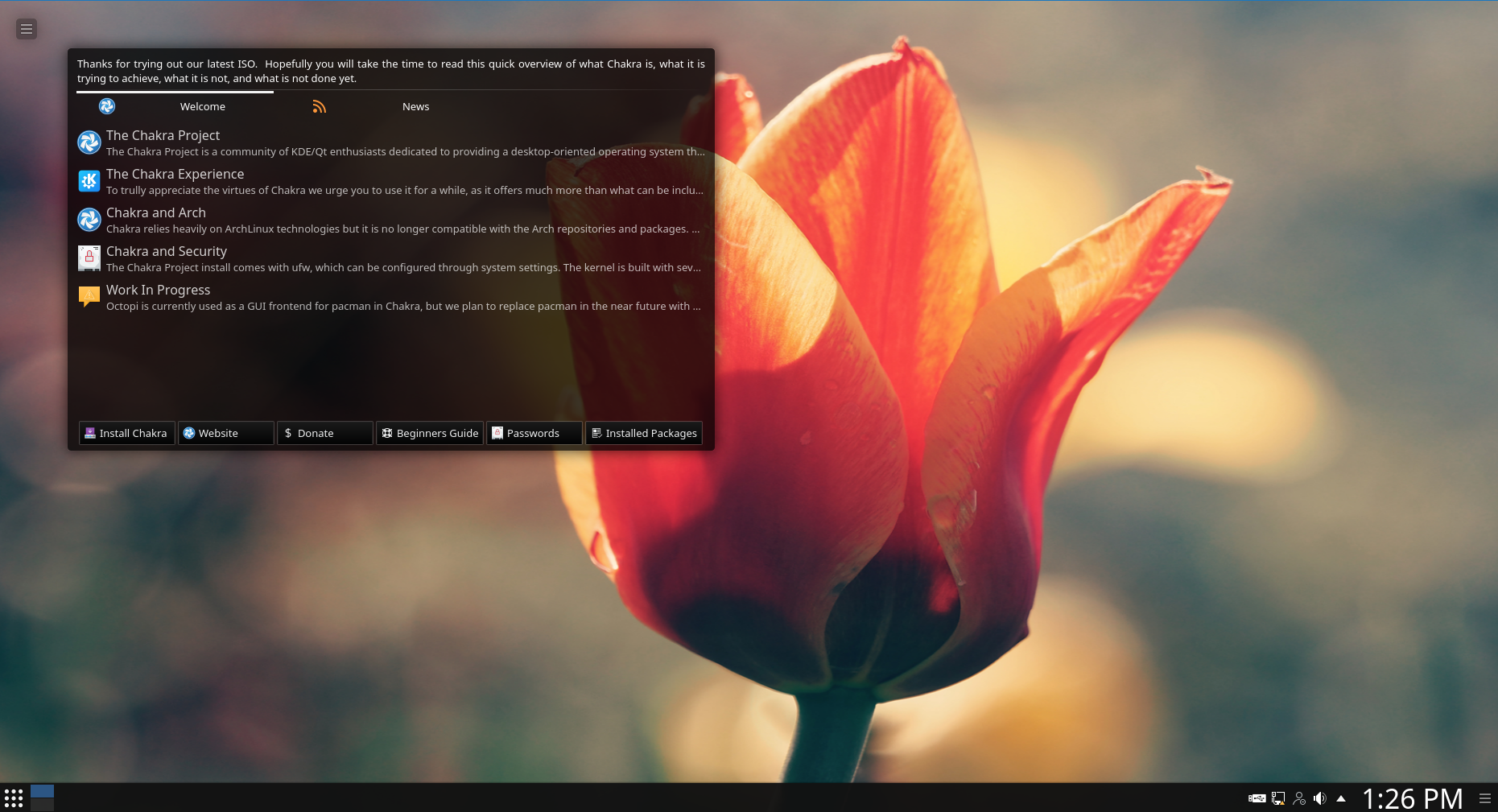
- Chakra with Heritage theme
- Developer: Chakra Team
- OS family: Linux (Unix-like)
- Working state: Discontinued
- Source model: Open source
- Final release: (Half-Rolling release) / Installation medium: 2017.10-Goedel
- Package manager: Pacman
- Supported platforms: x86-64
- Kernel type: Monolithic (Linux)
- Userland: GNU
- Default user interface: KDE Plasma Desktop
- License: Free software licenses (mainly GPL)
- Official website: www.chakralinux.org

Chakra (officially Chakra GNU/Linux) was a Linux distribution originally based on Arch Linux and focused on KDE software, intending to provide a KDE/Qt minimizing the use of other widget toolkits where possible. It was well received by critics during its existence.

== History ==
In June 2006 a group of Arch Linux users initiated the KDEmod packaging project to improve and simplify a standard KDE installation with Arch Linux. In December 2008 the group released their first custom made ISO with a preconfigured Arch + KDEmod + Tribe. After several releases lead developer Jan Mette suggested to split from Arch to allow for a much closer integration with KDE software.

On August 30, 2010, the first independent version, called Chakra 0.2, was released. This ended the development on KDEmod and the project was renamed to "The Chakra Project".

On December 27, 2021, the lead developer of Chakra announced the discontinuation of the project including accounts and services, citing a lack of project activity since November 2019.

On 11 April 2022, the board of Software in the Public Interest, Inc. (SPI), who owned the trademark of Chakra, voted unanimously on the removal of Chakra as an associated project of the SPI, based on the request from Chakra.

== Features ==
Chakra included both free and proprietary software, though the latter had the ability to be disabled during installation. It was only available for the x86_64 architecture, with support for i686 having been dropped in August 2012. It is based on KDE Software Compilation.

Chakra did not schedule releases for specific dates but used a "Half-Rolling release" system. This meant that the core packages of Chakra (graphics, audio, etc.) were frozen and only updated to fix security vulnerabilities. The aforementioned packages were updated after the latest versions were thoroughly tested before being moved to the stable repositories (about every six months). This allowed Chakra to ensure stability for the rest of the software included. Other applications such as web browsers, office suites, etc. were updated following the rolling release model and were generally available immediately after their release.

== Installation ==
The Chakra website supplied ISO images that could be run from CD, DVD or USB. Two ISO image versions were provided; a full edition providing more applications, and a minimal edition providing less applications. The graphical Chakra installation program was called "Calamares".

== Package management ==
=== Repositories ===
The following repositories were known to exist during Chakra's existence:

- core, which contains all the packages needed to set up a base system.
- desktop, which contains KDE Software Compilation packages and Chakra tools.
- gtk, which contains various well-known GTK applications.
- lib32, a centralized repository for x86_64 users to more readily support 32-bit applications in a 64-bit environment.

A testing repository also existed that contained versions of packages that were deemed not stable, but ready for testing by users.

There were also unstable repositories that included applications still considered to be unstable. These repositories also included packages built directly from the upstream source code, and were not ready for the testing or stable repositories. There were two repositories that fulfilled this, the repositories being:

- unstable, which contains development versions of general packages.
- kde-unstable, which contains development versions of KDE Software Compilation packages.

=== Chakra Community Repository (CCR) ===
In addition to the official repositories, users could install packages from the Chakra Community Repository (CCR). Like the Arch User Repository (AUR) which inspired it, the CCR provides user-made PKGINFOs and PKGBUILD scripts for software which is not included in the official repositories. CCR packages simplify building from source by explicitly listing and checking for dependencies and configuring the install to match the Chakra architecture. The CCR helper programs can further streamline the downloading and building process.

A CCR package with many votes and which conforms to the Chakra software policy may be transferred to the official repositories.

== Reception ==
Jesse Smith reviewed Chakra GNU/Linux 0.3.1 for DistroWatch Weekly:

Moving on to the technology itself, Chakra is downloadable as a 686 MB ISO. We begin our experience of the live CD with a graphical boot menu where we can select our preferred language. From there we're given a variety of boot options, including booting graphically, booting graphically on older machines and booting into a terminal. Taking the default option brought me to a KDE 4.5 environment featuring a blue background and a dark panel. On the desktop is a collection of icons for viewing licenses, reading documentation, visiting the project's forum, launching the installer, seeing a list of installed packages and there's an icon labelled "passwords". I decided to start with the "passwords" icon in case I would need to perform authentication later. Upon clicking the icon my system froze. I rebooted and this time Chakra locked-up before it finished loading the desktop. Going back and trying different boot options didn't get me any further.

LinuxBSDos.com wrote a review about Chakra Linux in 2011. It stated:

This is what the disk setup step looks like. You can only specify that a partition be formatted, and a mount point and a file system for the partition. Disk partitioning itself is done by a helper application which you can access by clicking on the Advanced… button. The helper application is KDE Partition Manager. Ext3 is the default file system, but ext4, xfs, jfs and reiserfs are supported. NTFS, FAT16 and FAT32 are also supported. Disk encryption is not supported. Do you notice the number of primary partitions in the image?

Dedoimedo reviewed Chakra 2011.09. Dedoimedo wrote:

Chakra does not presume to be the most beautiful or functional, just an equal dose of both, and I like this approach. First, all of the expect network connectivity was there, including Wireless, Samba sharing and such. A good start.

LWN.net wrote a post on Chakra Linux. Said post stated:

Today, Chakra maintains its own repositories, with a schedule that Anke Boersma, one of the founding developers, describes as a "half-rolling release" as opposed to Arch's continual updates. In other words, while many applications are continually upgraded, they are tested and released in sets to minimize potential problems. In addition, core packages are upgraded on a semi-regular schedule. In this way, Chakra hopes to avoid the problems its founders found in maintaining KDE support for Arch.

Everyday Linux User reviewed Chakra 2015.11. Said review included the following statement:

Chakra also requires a certain amount of skill to use. When I first started using it I did get to the stage where I wondered exactly who the target audience for Chakra is. Arch has a huge set of repositories and if you really want to get your hands dirty would you not just use Arch? In which case, what is the point of a similar distribution that is smaller in terms of the size of community?
