= Korora (operating system) =

Kororā
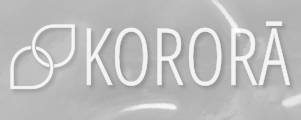
- Developer: Christopher Smart and Ian Firns
- OS family: Linux (Unix-like)
- Working state: Discontinued
- Source model: Open source
- Latest release: Korora 26 / 16 September 2017; 9 years ago
- Update method: DNF (PackageKit)
- Package manager: RPM Package Manager
- Supported platforms: i686, AMD64
- Kernel type: Monolithic (Linux)
- Default user interface: KDE Plasma Desktop, GNOME, Xfce, Cinnamon, MATE
- License: Various
- Official website: kororaproject.org

Korora (previously Kororaa) was a remix of the Fedora Linux distribution. Originally Kororaa was a binary installation method for Gentoo Linux which aimed for easy installation of a Gentoo system by using install scripts instead of manual configuration. The name derives from the Māori word kororā – the little penguin.

== History ==
Korora was started by Christopher Smart as a method to quickly reproduce a Gentoo Linux installation on multiple desktop machines. Smart also intended that Korora be used to quickly demonstrate the power of Gentoo Linux to users critical of 'compile times'. On November 7, 2007, Smart announced that he was discontinuing his work on the project, and that there would be no new versions of Korora.

The introduction of the Korora XGL Live CD was intended to demonstrate the capabilities of Novell's Xgl and Compiz.

On December 23, 2010, Smart announced rebirth of Korora as a Fedora remix.

On May 2, 2013, Korora 18 was released, featuring a revised name spelled with only one a and a new logo.

On May 16, 2018, Korora stopped its development.

== Kororaa XGL Live CD ==
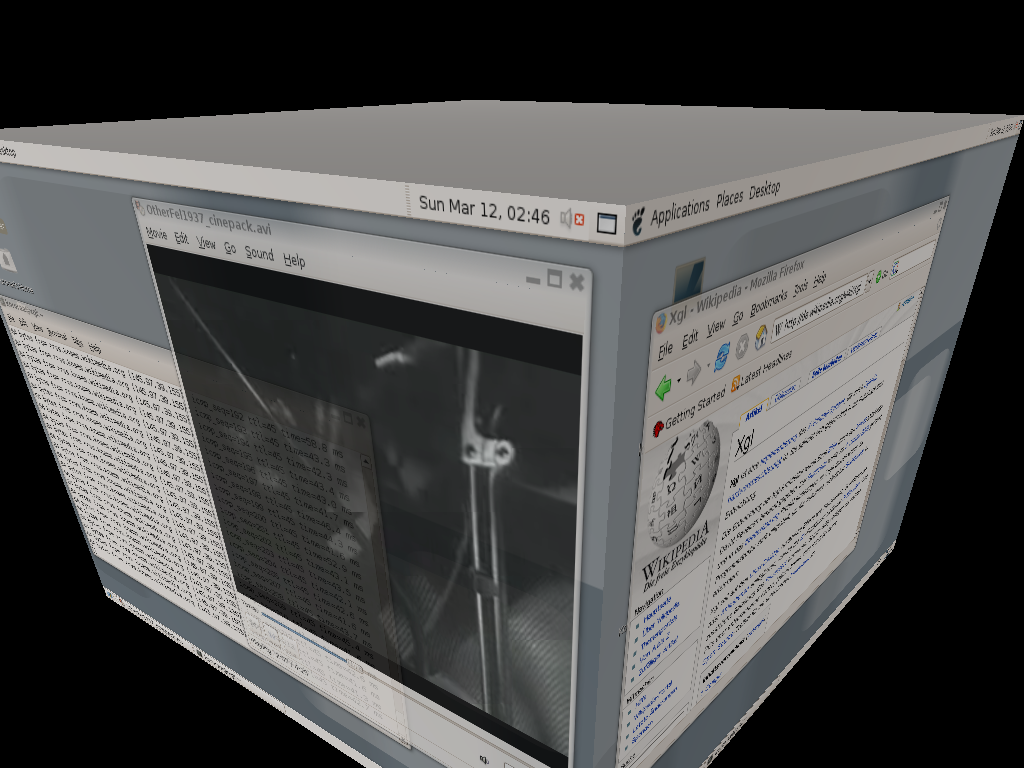
Screenshot of the Xgl abilities of the Kororaa Live CD

In March 2006, a Korora based Live CD was released, preconfigured with Xgl capabilities. The live CD supports NVIDIA, ATI and Intel graphics cards, and the latest version (0.3) comes with both K Desktop Environment 3 and GNOME.

== Development hiatus and restart ==
On November 7, 2007, Smart announced that development on Korora would be ended, and no further versions would be released; the reasons given were that:

- Sabayon Linux already serves a purpose as a binary Gentoo distribution
- Gentoo already comes with a GUI installer
- Compiz is already installed by default in the MATE-edition.
- Korora could not compete with other distributions which include non-free drivers by default.
- the weight of the project was too much for a single developer.

On December 23, 2010, Smart announced the restart of Korora with a release of the Fedora-based version of the distro:

I know that you'll be looking for something Linux related to do over your Christmas holidays and New Year, so I've just released the first installable live DVD beta for testing. The final release will be Korora 14 (derived from Fedora 14), code-named 'Nemo'. As with the original Korora, it's based on KDE. Essentially, Korora has been reborn as a Fedora remix, inspired by Rahul Sundaram's Omega GNOME remix. It aims to provide all general computing uses out of the box and it aims to include software packages that most users will want.

== Version history ==
Version	Release date	Underlying System
Beta 2 R1	2005-12-12	Gentoo
XGL Live CD 0.1	2006-03-08	Gentoo
XGL Live CD 0.2	2006-04-06	Gentoo
XGL Live CD 0.3	2006-10-04	Gentoo
14 Beta	2010-12-25	Fedora
14 Beta 2	2011-02-11	Fedora
14 Beta 3	2011-03-02	Fedora
14 Beta 4	2011-03-22	Fedora
14 Beta 5	2011-03-31	Fedora
14 Beta 6	2011-04-22	Fedora
Kororaa Linux 14	2011-05-31	Fedora
15 Beta	2011-07-16	Fedora
15 Beta 2	2011-07-20	Fedora
Kororaa Linux 15	2011-09-20	Fedora
Kororaa Linux 15.1	2011-10-20	Fedora
Kororaa Linux 16	2011-12-16	Fedora
Kororaa Linux 17	2012-07-16	Fedora
Korora 18	2013-05-02	Fedora
Korora 19	2013-07-02	Fedora
Korora 19.1	2013-10-08	Fedora
Korora 20	2014-01-10	Fedora
Korora 21 Beta	2015-01-03	Fedora
Korora 21	2015-02-07	Fedora
Korora 22	2015-08-02	Fedora
Korora 23	2016-02-07	Fedora
Korora 24	2016-07-19	Fedora
Korora 25	2016-12-07	Fedora
Korora 26	2017-09-16	Fedora
