= Parsix =

Parsix GNU/Linux
- Developer: Alan Baghumian
- OS family: Linux (Unix-like)
- Source model: Mixed
- Initial release: 1 February 2005
- Latest release: 8.15 / January 25, 2017; 9 years ago
- Available in: English
- Supported platforms: I386, AMD64
- Kernel type: Monolithic (Linux)
- Default user interface: GNOME
- License: Various

Parsix GNU/Linux was a live-CD Linux distribution based on Debian. The Parsix project's goal was to provide a ready-to-use, easy-to-install, desktop and laptop-optimized operating system based on Debian's testing branch and the latest stable release of GNOME. It was possible to install extra software packages from the project's own APT repositories.

In 2017, the official website announced the shutdown of the project, and suggested users switch to Debian Stretch.

== Logo ==
The Parsix logo is inspired by stone flower carvings found in Persepolis.

== Usage ==
Parsix Linux was designed to be used as a Live CD, Live USB, or installed operating system on a hard disk drive. Live mode is useful for operations such as data recovery or hard drive partitioning.

== Versions ==
=== History ===
The first version of Parsix GNU/Linux was announced in February 2005 by Alan Baghumian. Seeking a more stable platform, the project started using Debian testing branch as of version 0.85. Starting with version 0.90, Parsix uses characters from the movie Happy Feet to name their releases. The project's own APT repositories were launched in February 2008. The multimedia repository, Wonderland, was launched in September 2010. The Parsix project started to offer security updates for their stable and testing branches as of December 2010.

| Version | Release Date | Codename |
|---|---|---|
| 8.15 | 2017-01-25 | —N/a |
| 8.10 | 2016-07-31 | —N/a |
| 8.5 | 2016-02-14 | —N/a |
| 8.0 | 2015-09-14 | Mumble |
| 7.5 | 2015-05-17 | —N/a |
| 7.0r1 | 2015-02-13 | Nestor |
| 7.0r0 | 2014-11-08 | Nestor |
| 6.0r1 | 2014-06-25 | Trev |
| 6.0r0 | 2014-04-26 | Trev |
| 5.0r1 | 2013-12-25 | Lombardo |
| 5.0r0 | 2013-08-17 | Lombardo |
| 4.0r3 | 2013-04-21 | Gloria |
| 4.0r2 | 2013-02-04 | Gloria |
| 4.0r1 | 2013-01-01 | Gloria |
| 4.0r0 | 2012-11-12 | Gloria |
| 3.7r2a | 2012-02-20 | Raul |
| 3.7r2 | 2012-02-11 | Raul |
| 3.7r1 | 2011-10-09 | Raul |
| 3.7r0 | 2011-08-14 | Raul |
| 3.6r2 | 2011-04-02 | Vinnie |
| 3.6r1 | 2010-12-15 | Vinnie |
| 3.6r0 | 2010-09-06 | Vinnie |
| 3.5r0 | 2010-05-31 | Frankie |
| 3.0r2 | 2010-02-07 | Kev |
| 3.0r1 | 2009-12-20 | Kev |
| 3.0r0 | 2009-10-15 | Kev |
| 2.0r0 | 2009-03-21 | Boss Skua |
| 1.5r2 | 2008-10-23 | Miss Viola |
| 1.5r1 | 2008-07-30 | Miss Viola |
| 1.5r0 | 2008-06-28 | Miss Viola |
| 1.0r1 | 2008-03-13 | Ramón |
| 1.0r0 | 2008-01-25 | Ramón |
| 0.90r2 | 2007-10-04 | Barry |
| 0.90r1 | 2007-08-16 | Barry |
| 0.90r0 | 2007-06-17 | Barry |
| 0.85.1 | 2007-03-01 | No. |
| 0.85 | 2006-12-01 | No. |
| 0.80.1 | 2006-06-19 | No. |
| 0.80 | 2006-06-05 | No. |
| 0.76 | 2006-02-07 | No. |
| 0.75 | 2006-01-17 | No. |
| 0.70 | 2005-11-13 | WSIS 2005 |
| 0.60 | 2005-06-29 | No. |
| 0.50 | 2005-05-02 | No. |
| 0.46 | 2005-03-15 | No. |
| 0.45 | 2005-02-01 | No. |

== Receptions ==
DistroWatch Weekly reviewed Parsix 1.5r1 in 2008:

Parsix is a nice solid little distro, but I'm finding it difficult to list one hard compelling reason why someone should switch to it. If you prefer the Persian language and keyboard, then Parsix is definitely for you. If you'd like a nice Debian derivative with a pretty GNOME desktop that works good, comes in one CD, and uses APT/Synaptic, then perhaps give Parsix a try.

LinuxBSDos wrote the review of Parsix 3.0r2:

This is clearly a negative review, and at some level, I’m hoping that someone will prove to me that this review is completely off the mark. I’m waiting.
