= Jurix =

jurix
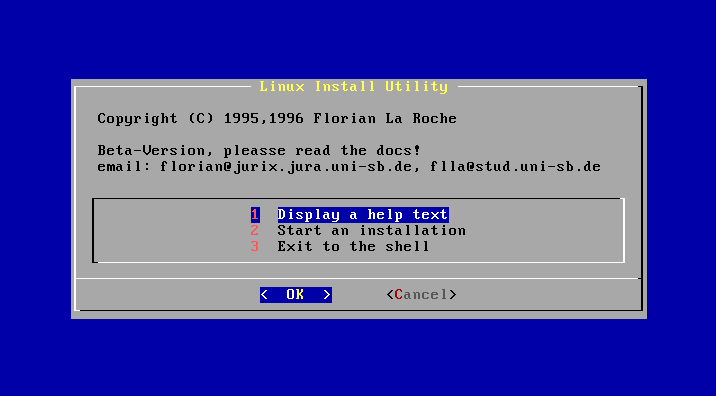
- Developer: Florian La Roche
- OS family: Linux (Unix-like)
- Working state: Discontinued
- Initial release: 1993; 32 years ago
- Final release: with kernel 2.0.36 / November 17, 1998; 26 years ago
- License: GNU GPL
- Official website: linux.mathematik.tu-darmstadt.de/pub/linux/distributions/jurix/docs

Jurix was an early Linux distribution created by Florian La Roche, a former employee of the legal department at Saarland University. The distribution was maintained between 1993 and 1999 and hosted on the now-defunct "jurix.jura.uni-sb.de" and "susix.jura.uni-sb.de" domains.

In 1996, jurix superseded Slackware as a base for SuSE Linux.

The name "jurix" was borrowed from the department's first HTTP server, named by Alexander Sigel. It is not known whether the name was taken from the nearby Dutch law and IT organisation JURIX, or simply a portmanteau of "Jura" (meaning "law" in German) and "Unix".

A readme from 1999 touts the following software, among others:

- modularized kernel 2.0.37 and 2.2.10
- libc 5.4.46
- egcs 1.1.2
- ncurses 4.2-980822
- shadow passwords
- XFree86 3.3.3.1
- KDE 1.1.1
