= Pixart =

Pixart SRL.
- Company type: SRL
- Industry: Software Development
- Founded: 1998
- Headquarters: Capital Federal, Argentina
- Key people: 4
- Products: Rxart family
- Revenue: 500.000 USS
- Number of employees: 40
- Website: www.pixartargentina.com.ar

Pixart SRL is a company based in Argentina dedicated to the development of free software, particularly the Rxart computer operating system, which is based on Debian.

== History ==
Pixart started in 1998 as a regional representative of Corel in Latin America. When Corel discontinued their operating system product, Pixart decided to continue the project, receiving technical and legal support from Corel.

Corel gave the English version of their operating system to Xandros, and agreed to give the Spanish and Portuguese versions to Pixart.

These products, coupled with many sales agreements, have made Pixart one of the largest Linux-related companies in Latin America.

== Rxart ==
Rxart is a Linux distribution developed in Argentina and based on Debian. Owing to the number of computers sold with Rxart pre-installed, Rxart has become a very popular Spanish language distribution in Latin America, reaching an installed base of 350,000 units in 2005.

Its origins date back to 1999, when the founder and CEO of Pixart, Gabriel Ortiz, decided to develop a user-friendly distribution intended mainly for hardware assemblers. After an agreement in 2007 between Lenovo and Pixart, Rxart version 3.2 was made available pre-installed on desktop PCs in Argentina.

The distribution is available in English, Portuguese and Spanish.

=== Development ===
Pixart began being sold as pre-installed in Argentina, in numerous wholesale channels, including Garbarino, Fravega, Carrefour, Jumbo, Megatone, Sicsa, Pcarts, New Tree, and Compumundo. Basing the distribution on Debian GNU/Linux 3.1 (Sarge), the company added proprietary software components.

Pixart has contacts with Sun Microsystems, IBM, Intel, AMD, PChips, Smartlink and Biostar, among other companies.

In August 2006, Rxart was chosen as the operating system for the Intel Classmate PC in a pilot scheme by the government of Venezuela. From June 2007, AMD started distributing components to various countries around the world with Rxart preloaded for their demonstrations. Also in June, Pixart signed an agreement with Sun Microsystem to bundle StarOffice with Rxart.

In Pixart laboratories, several companies collaborated by sending hardware for the development of device drivers. Among them were Lexmark, Epson, Intel, AMD, PCtel, Miro, HP and Dell.

Rxart is named after one of the collaborators for the MANCOOSI project in the European Union.

== See also ==
- List of Linux distributions
