= Clear Linux OS =

Linux distribution by Intel

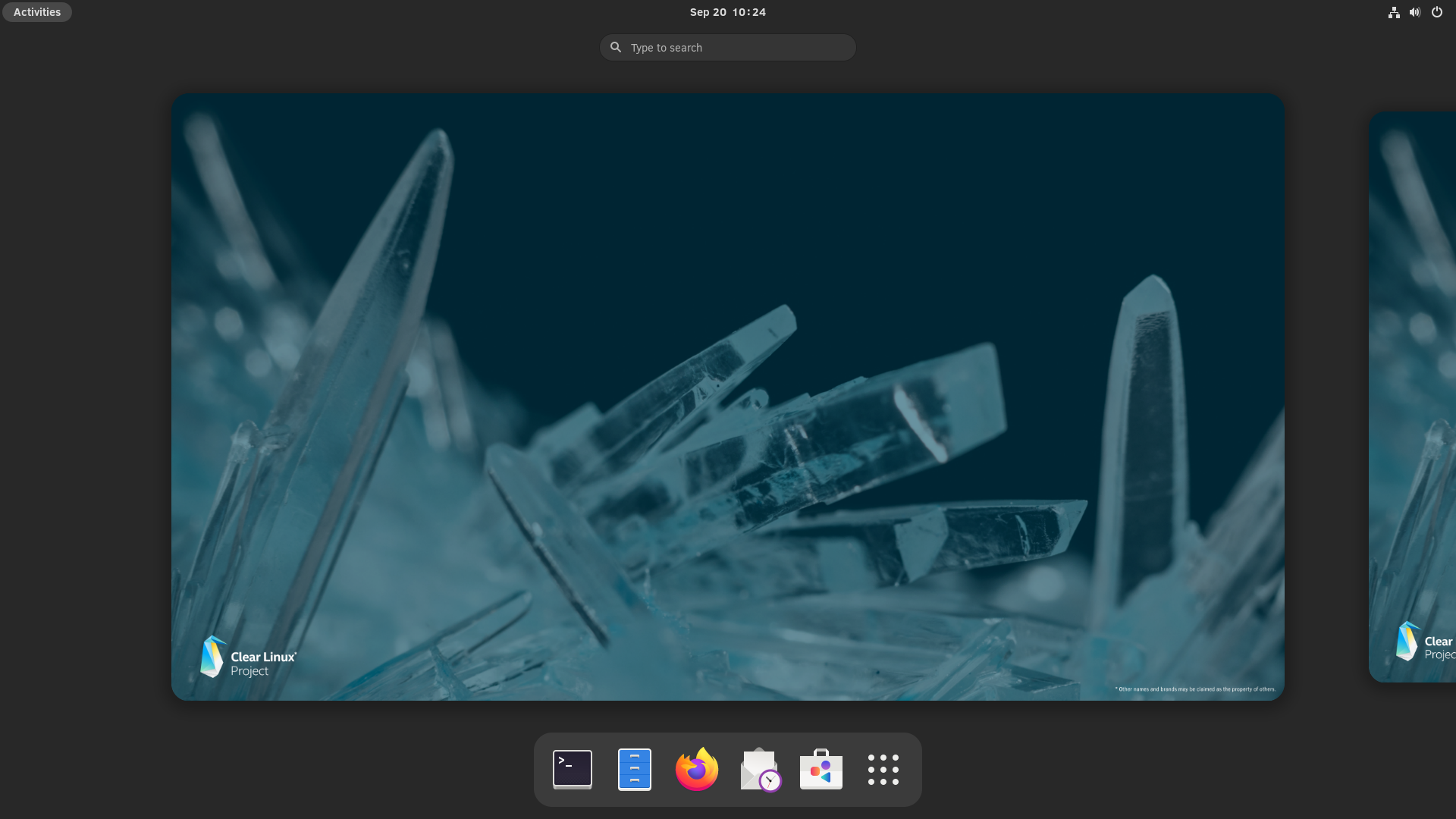
- Clear Linux OS's default GNOME desktop (2021)
- Developer: Intel
- OS family: Linux (Unix-like)
- Working state: Discontinued
- Source model: Open source
- Initial release: February 6, 2015; 11 years ago
- Final release: 43800 / July 21, 2025; 10 months ago
- Repository: github.com/clearlinux
- Marketing target: DevOps, AI, Cloud, Container
- Available in: English, Spanish, Chinese
- Update method: Rolling release, auto-updating
- Package manager: swupd
- Supported platforms: x86-64
- Kernel type: Monolithic kernel (Linux)
- Default user interface: GNOME with GDM
- License: Multiple
- Official website: clearlinux.org

Clear Linux OS (Note: Clear Linux was referred to in early documentation as Clear Linux™ OS, later as Clear Linux* OS with a corresponding footnote acknowledging that the rights to "Linux" may be possessed by others. Clear Linux OS has been referred to, in the literature, as Clear Linux™ OS, Clear Linux* OS, Clear Linux OS, Clear Linux* and Clear Linux.) is a discontinued Linux distribution, once developed and maintained on Intel's 01.org open-source platform, and optimized for Intel's microprocessors with an emphasis on performance and security. Its optimizations were also effective on AMD systems. Clear Linux OS followed a rolling release model. Clear Linux OS was not intended to be a general-purpose Linux distribution; it was designed to be used by IT professionals for DevOps, AI application development, cloud computing, and containers.

== History ==
In 2015, Intel introduced Clear Linux OS at OpenStack Summit 2015, Vancouver initially, it was limited to cloud usage. Intel began the Clear Containers project to address container security. In 2015, originally, Clear Linux OS was deployed as a single monolithic unit. In May 2019, Clear Linux OS released a new Desktop Installer and started a Help Forum.

On July 18, 2025, Intel announced the end of support Clear Linux OS, effective immediately.

On March 1, 2026, it was reported that Intel had silently taken down the Clear Linux OS website. The archived assets relevant to the project remain available on GitHub.

Clear Linux OS is available via Microsoft Azure marketplace, and Amazon Web Services marketplace.

== Requirements ==
Clear Linux OS supports 2nd generation Intel Core (Sandy Bridge) CPUs and later, Xeon E3 and later, and Silvermont-based Intel Atom C2000 and E3800 processors. An installed system is booted via the EFI boot loader or via systemd-boot. Minimum system requirements are SSE4 and CLMUL (carry-less multiplication), as well as UEFI.

== Features ==
Clear Linux OS uses reference stacks to install images that are optimized and tested together for specific use-cases. It also utilizes a strict separation between User data and System config files, called stateless, so that even a misconfigured system will still boot correctly and then perform a factory reset so it can be reconfigured.

=== Desktop ===
By default, Clear Linux OS ships with the GNOME desktop environment and most graphical effects are disabled. KDE Plasma and Xfce are also available for installation.

=== Package management ===
Packages are usually installed and updated through bundles with the help of swupd, which is described as an OS-level software update program, using delta updates to minimize update size. Flatpak is also preinstalled and can be used to install and use packages.

Mixer is the tool for creating 3rd-party-bundles, which can then be installed using swupd.
