= Zenwalk =

Slackware-based Linux distribution

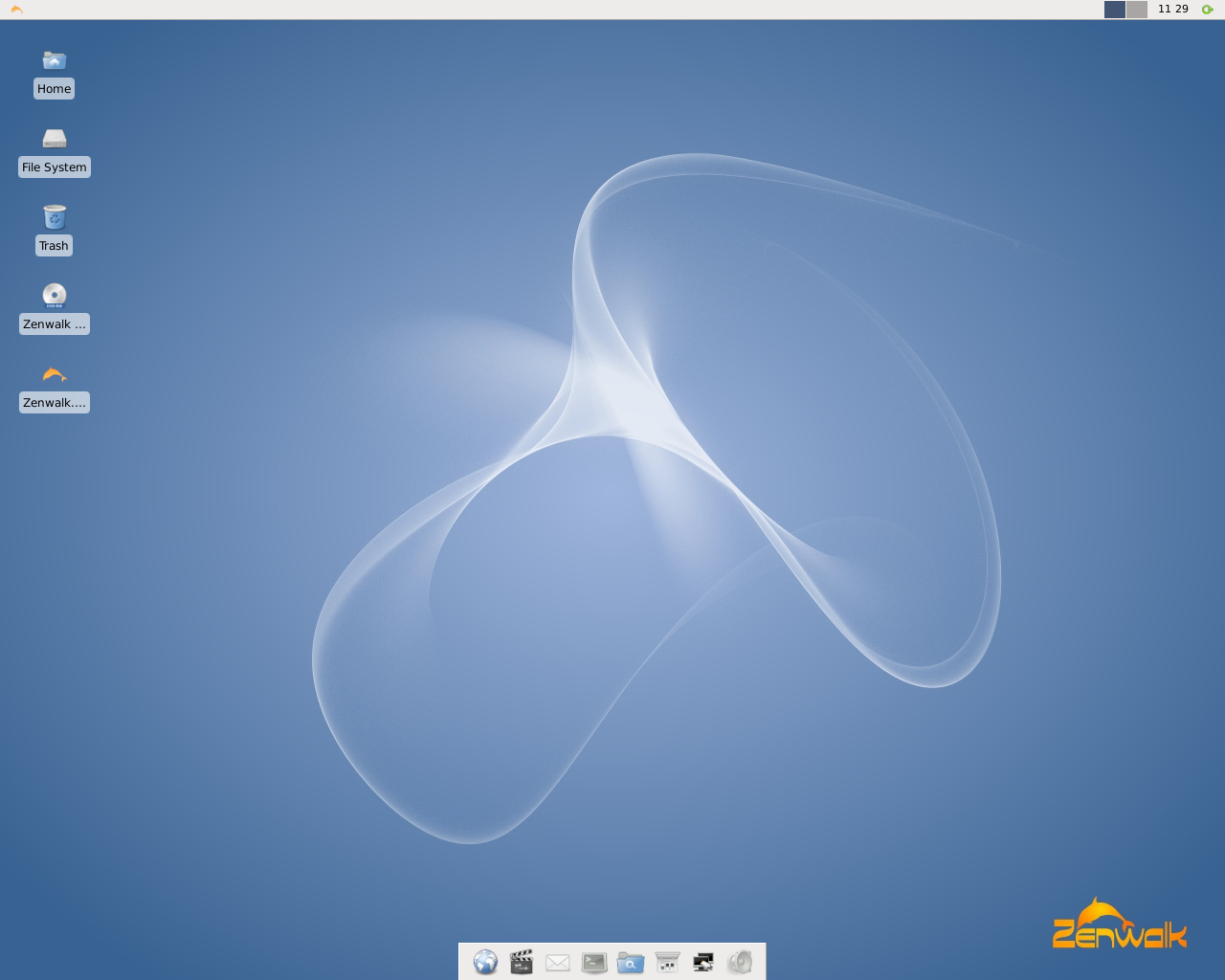
- Zenwalk 6.0
- Developer: Jean-Philippe Guillemin
- OS family: Linux
- Working state: Current
- Source model: Open source
- Latest release: current-250116 / 16 January 2025; 20 months ago
- Update method: netpkg (xnetpkg)
- Package manager: netpkg
- Kernel type: Monolithic (Linux)
- Default user interface: Xfce
- License: Various
- Official website: www.zenwalk.org

Zenwalk GNU/Linux is a desktop-focused Linux distribution founded by Jean-Philippe Guillemin. It is based on Slackware with very few modifications at system level making it 100% compatible with Slackware. It aims to be a modern, multi-purpose Linux distribution by focusing on internet applications, multimedia and programming tools. It comes with many specialized tools and is designed for beginners and advanced users alike, as it offers system configuration via both graphical tools and the command line.

== History ==
Zenwalk was originally called Minislack up to version 1.1. It was renamed with version 1.2, released on 12 August 2005. Originally using KDE as its desktop environment, it moved to Xfce with version 0.3, although GNOME and KDE packages have always been available separately.

== Aims ==
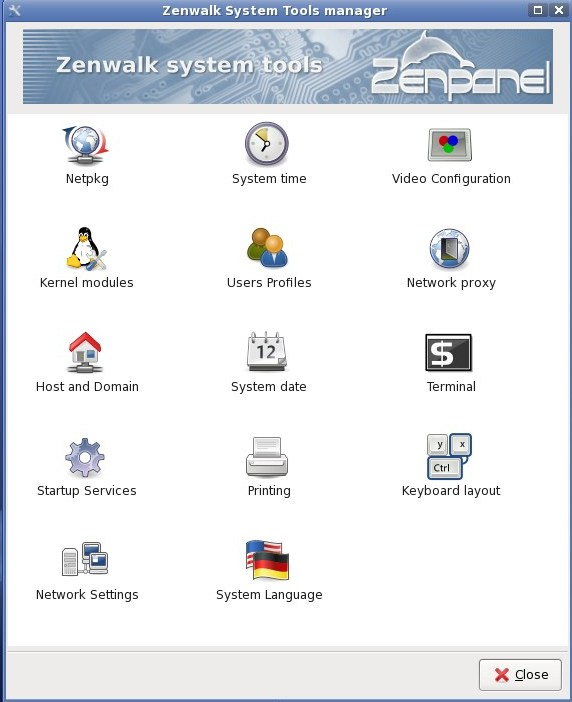
Zenpanel, a system configuration utility.

The Zenwalk Project aims to create a lightweight Linux distribution, through using only one application per task on the release ISO image; optimization for a specific instruction set architecture, to increase execution speed; and introducing a comprehensive package management system with dependency resolution.

== Package management ==
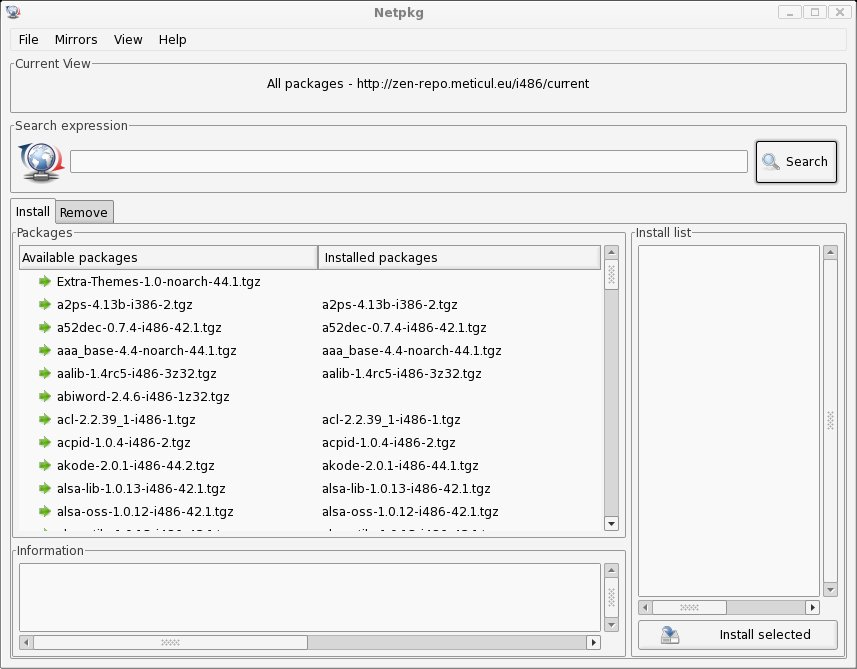
Zenwalk's netpkg in its GUI guise, xnetpkg.

Zenwalk uses the netpkg package management system. Developed in-house, it provides the main functionality of the apt-get variety of package managers. It uses Slackware's .tgz package format, but adds dependency resolution capabilities. It uses meta files to provide dependency information, as well as package description during the install process. This convenience is available only to the official Zenwalk mirrors listed in the netpkg configuration file, netpkg.conf. In addition to the original netpkg command line interface, xnetpkg provides a GUI frontend with similar capabilities.

Zenwalk is also compatible with Slackware package management tools such as slapt-get and its frontends, and have similar functionality as that of netpkg.

As of Zenwalk 4.6, package compatibility with Slackware is still maintained. Slackware packages may be used in place of Zenwalk packages where necessary.

Zenwalk release history
version	date
Minislack 0.1	May 21, 2004
Minislack 0.2	August 8, 2004
Minislack 0.3	February 17, 2005
Minislack 0.4	March 26, 2005
Minislack 1.0	April 24, 2005
Minislack 1.0.1	May 3, 2005
Minislack 1.1	June 10, 2005
Zenwalk 1.2	August 12, 2005
Zenwalk 1.3	October 15, 2005
Zenwalk 2.0 Core	November 27, 2005
Zenwalk 2.0.1	December 4, 2005
Zenwalk 2.1 (Core)	January 18, 2006
Zenwalk 2.2	February 16, 2006
Zenwalk 2.4	April 4, 2006
Zenwalk 2.6	May 23, 2006
Zenwalk 2.8	July 21, 2006
Zenwalk 3.0	September 8, 2006
Zenwalk 4.0	November 20, 2006
Zenwalk 4.2	January 6, 2007
Zenwalk 4.4	February 22, 2007
Zenwalk 4.4.1	February 24, 2007
Zenwalk 4.6	June 1, 2007
Zenwalk 4.6.1	June 6, 2007
Zenwalk 4.8	October 6, 2007
Zenwalk 5.0	January 18, 2008
Zenwalk 5.2	June 7, 2008
Zenwalk 6.0	March 7, 2009
Zenwalk 6.2	September 6, 2009
Zenwalk 6.4	May 27, 2010
Zenwalk 7.0	Mar 25, 2011
Zenwalk 7.2	Oct 11, 2012
Zenwalk 7.4	April 2014
Zenwalk 8.0	July 2016
Zenwalk 15.0	4 February 2022

== Supported architectures ==
Starting with version 8.0, Zenwalk Linux is built and optimized primarily for the x86_64 architecture; 32-bit i486 architecture is no longer supported.

== Project versions ==
At one time there were five main versions of Zenwalk :

- Zenwalk Standard, a distribution aimed at mainstream desktop and development use. Designed to be a stand-alone operating system, it installs to the hard drive by way of an ncurses-based installer. It includes all of the officially released software packages that are deemed most useful by the Zenwalk community. The default install also includes development packages like gcc, and some proprietary media packages (such as Adobe Flash Player) and drivers in order to provide a full featured default install. The default desktop environment is Xfce.
- Zenwalk Core (discontinued), a Zenwalk system built for user customization. Released with no X Window System binaries, its aim was to allow a skilled user to build a system fit for their needs. The project's lead developer was Emmanuel Bailleul.
- ZenLive (discontinued), a Zenwalk system built on a Live CD design. ZenLive followed the progress made by the full Zenwalk system closely, thus mirroring the version number, and attempted to stay true to the original distribution's goals. In addition, it included all of the necessary libraries and applications to develop and compile software, a particularly rare feature in Live CD distributions. The original ZenLive team left the project after version 6.0 was released but ZenwalkLive project was revived by an enthusiastic user and developed as a one-man-project. With version 6.4 the live-framework changed from deprecated linux-live-scripts to slackware-live-scripts.
- Zenwalk Gnome (discontinued), with GNOME as the default desktop environment.
- Zenwalk Openbox (discontinued), supplied with Openbox as stand-alone window manager. It was a very lightweight version of the operating system and did not use LXDE in its choice of software. It still uses Thunar File Manager over PCManFM which is standard on LXDE-based systems such as Lubuntu.

== Derivatives ==
There are currently three known Zenwalk-based distributions:

- Arudius, a now-discontinued live CD distribution for information assurance with tools for penetration testing and vulnerability analysis
- SLAMPP, intended to be used as a home server
- Zencafe, an Indonesian distribution designed for internet cafes

== Live USB ==
A Live USB of Zenwalk Linux for versions up to 5.2 can be created manually or with UNetbootin. Current versions of Zenwalk can also booted from a USB using Ventoy, but only for installation, not a live session.

== See also ==
- Slackware
