= Webconverger =

Operating system

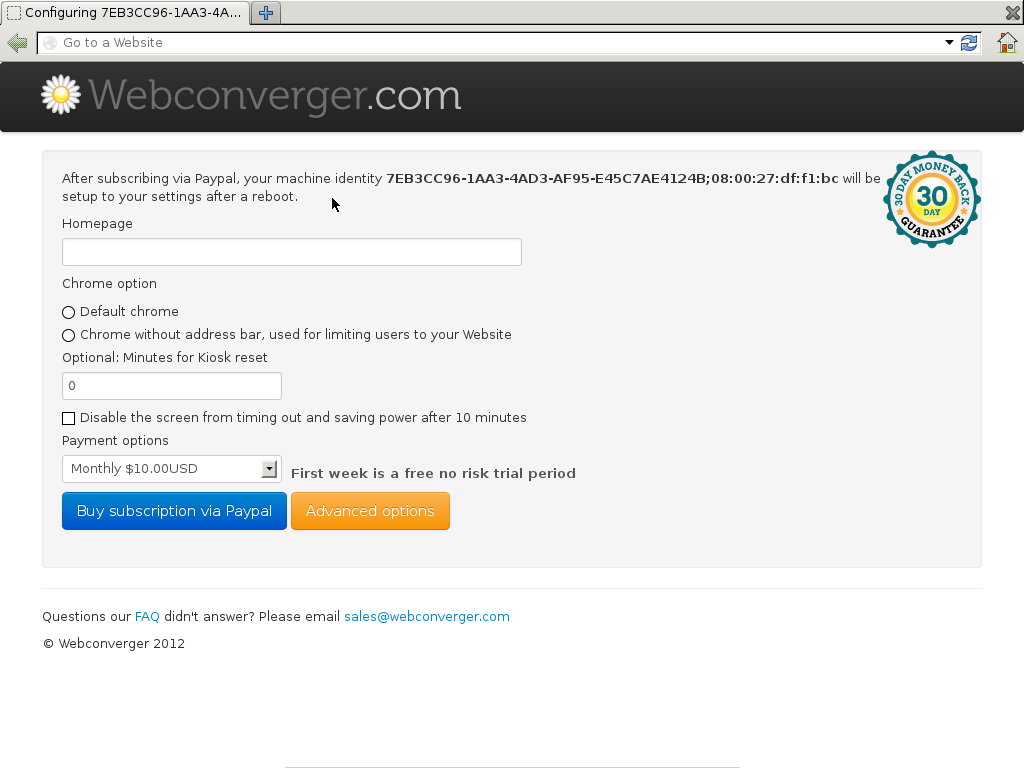
- Webconverger default
- Developer: Webconverger Ltd
- OS family: Debian (Linux / Unix-like)
- Working state: Discontinued
- Source model: Mainly open-source and closed source
- Initial release: 2007
- Latest release: 35.0 / 19 May 2016; 10 years ago
- Available in: Multilingual
- Package manager: git
- Supported platforms: x86
- Kernel type: Monolithic (Linux)
- Default user interface: Browser
- License: Build script: MIT License; Linux kernel: GPL; Debian: Various free software Adobe Flash player: Proprietary
- Official website: webconverger.com

Webconverger is a discontinued Linux-based operating system designed solely for accessing Web applications privately and securely. Based on the Debian distro, it is able to boot live from removable media like CD-ROM or USB flash drive but can also be installed to a local hard drive. Webconverger is pre-compiled to run on any x86 hardware. It does not have high system requirements and will also run on older machines.

Webconverger is typically used in Web kiosk and digital signage deployments. It runs the Firefox web browser with a customised window manager dwm and a Firefox add-on also named Webconverger that locks the browser to a simple kiosk operation mode. The browser is locked down with most menus, toolbars, key commands and context menus disabled. Webconverger contains Adobe Flash support and PDF viewing by default. Both wired and wireless networks are supported via DHCP.

Webconverger does binary package updates through git hosted on GitHub. This is unique to Webconverger as most other distributions use separate package management utilities. Although developed in Singapore, it is mainly used commercially in Europe.

== Reception ==
LWN.net reviewed Webconverger 12 in April 2012 with following words:

By "kiosk" usage, the project means something rather specific. It is designed to support intermittent, anonymous users in an environment where system administrators are hard to come by. The examples listed on the project's commercial support page include unrestricted environments like libraries and public gathering spots, plus businesses with more specific needs (like retail banks or doctors' offices). In all cases, it is important that the user's private information be wiped as soon as the session ends, and that the kiosk cannot be altered to change browser or OS settings. The expectation is that with any sort of problem, from a power loss to a browser crash, the system will reboot quickly into a known good state.

Softpedia Linux also have a review of Webconverger 35.1:

It is ideal for public places where the need for guest computers or thin clients is a must, such as libraries, Internet Cafes, tourist information centres, and even banks. It provides users with only a web browser, locked down by default.

== See also ==
- Kiosk software
