= CyberTrust =

American security services company

- Type: Security services company
- Industry: Information security
- Predecessor: TruSecure; BeTrusted
- Founded: November 2004 (formed by merger)
- Fate: Acquired
- Successor: Verizon Business (2007)
- Headquarters: Virginia, United States
- Products: Security services; digital certificates; PKI; SSL certificates
- Parent: Verizon Business (from 2007)

CyberTrust was a security services company formed in Virginia in November 2004 from the merger of TruSecure and Betrusted. Betrusted previously acquired GTE Cybertrust for $3.2 million. Cybertrust acquired a large stake in Ubizen, a European security services firm based in Belgium, to become one of the largest information security firms in the world. It was acquired by Verizon Business in 2007. In 2015, the CyberTrust root certificates were acquired by DigiCert, Inc., a leading global Certificate Authority (CA) and provider of trusted identity and authentication services.

== History ==
CyberTrust was founded as a subsidiary of GTE Corporation's Government Systems Information Security Directorate. It focused on security services for electronic commerce. These included authentication, privacy, integrity and non-repudiation using Public Key Encryption technology. In 2000, GTE sold CyberTrust to Ireland-based security company Baltimore Technologies for $150 million. In 2003, Baltimore Technologies divested its operating companies, including all digital certificate operations to BeTrusted Holdings, Inc. A year later in September 2004, BeTrusted announced its intention to merge with former competitor TruSecure Corporation and in November the resulting company was incorporated in Virginia as CyberTrust. Verizon Business then acquired Cybertrust in 2007, reuniting it with its former parent (Verizon was created by the merger of GTE and Bell Atlantic). Financial terms were not disclosed. In 2015, the CyberTrust root certificates were acquired by DigiCert, Inc., a leading global Certificate Authority (CA) and provider of trusted identity and authentication services. The financial terms were not disclosed.

Cybertrust used its majority shareholding to dilute the remaining Ubizen shares, forcing it to acquire the remaining shares and delist Ubizen in 2005.

Betrusted was originally created by PWC and sold to One Equity Partners, a division of Bank 1. One Equity Partners also purchased 90 East and SecureNet (who bought the PKI component of Baltimore and the gateway operations of iSecure).

== Present ==
The acquisition of the CyberTrust root certificates makes DigiCert the second-largest Certificate Authority (CA) for high-assurance SSL Certificates. As part of the deal, DigiCert will assume management of the CyberTrust/Verizon trusted roots and intermediate certificates. Verizon will continue to offer SSL Certificates as a reseller of DigiCert.

Pursuant to DigiCert's acquiring Verizon Enterprise SSL business, DigiCert announces its partnership with Cybertrust Japan to expand its market presence in Asia. Under this new partnership, DigiCert and Cybertrust Japan also announce Cyber Secure Asia, a wholly owned subsidiary of Cybertrust Japan, which will market DigiCert's certificate technology to Southeast Asia from a regional headquarters in Singapore.
