= Debian Social Contract =

The Debian Social Contract (DSC) is a document that frames the moral agenda of the Debian project. The values outlined in the Social Contract provide the basic principles for the Debian Free Software Guidelines that serve as the basis of the Open Source Definition.

== The guarantees ==
Debian believes the makers of a free software operating system should provide guarantees when a user entrusts them with control of a computer. These guarantees include:

- Ensuring that the operating system remains open and free.
- Giving improvements back to the community that made the operating system possible.
- Not hiding problems with the software or organization.
- Staying focused on the users and the software that started the phenomenon.
- Making it possible for the software to be used with non-free software.

== History ==
The idea of the DSC was first proposed by Ean Schuessler after a conversation with Bob Young, co-founder of Red Hat. Schuessler said Red Hat should issue a set of guidelines that would guarantee to the community as the company expanded it would always be committed to the ideals of Free Software. Young said this would be a "kiss of death" for Red Hat, implying it would constrain the company's ability to generate profit. Concerned about Young's response, Schuessler and other Debian developers decided to broach the idea of a "social contract" that would supplement Debian's initial manifesto written by Ian Murdock. Bruce Perens later led the effort from June 1997 to coordinate the creation of the DSC using the Free Software Definition as its basis.

The Debian project ratified its social contract version 1.0 on July 5, 1997. Version 1.1 was ratified April 26, 2004, and version 1.2 of the contract was ratified October 1, 2022.
