= LinuxConsole =

Linux distribution

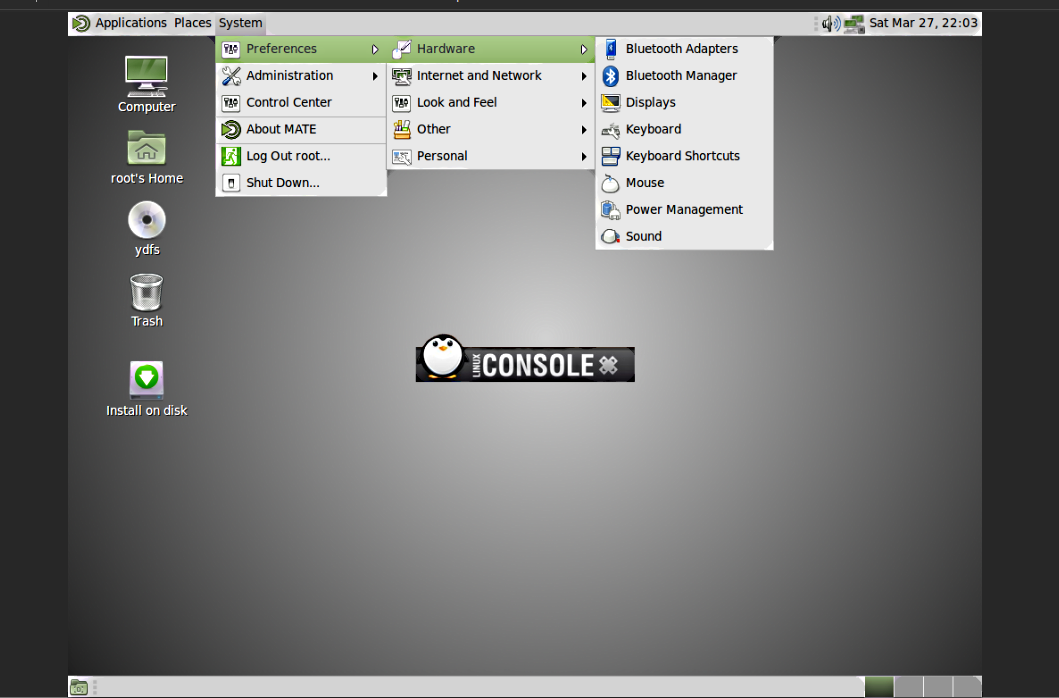
- Developer: Yann Le Doaré (primary)
- OS family: Linux (Unix-like)
- Working state: Active
- Source model: Open source
- Initial release: April 2004; 21 years ago
- Latest release: LinuxConsole 2024 / September 2024; 1 year ago
- Marketing target: Youth, and casual users with old computers.
- Available in: Multilingual
- Package manager: opkg, APT
- Supported platforms: i586, x86, x86-64
- Kernel type: Monolithic (Linux)
- Userland: Mate
- Default user interface: Graphical user interface
- License: GNU GPLv3
- Official website: www.linuxconsole.org

LinuxConsole is a Linux distribution independently developed by Yann Le Doaré. LinuxConsole should be written as a single word, and the use of the word "console" in the name does not relate to Linux's system console mode but instead represents its aim of providing a system more simple to use similar to that of a gaming console. This distro is built from scratch by developers from France, and has support for multiple languages. It is not based on any other Linux distribution and primarily features being lightweight and easily accessible. LinuxConsole can function as a live CD or live USB. It can also be installed as a complete operating system.

== History ==
The earliest known verifiable release is documented as version 0.4 in 2004 on DistroWatch, and was based on Mandrake Linux. Version 0.4 expanded upon the previous release by adding many applications, and tools making it useful for more than just games and multimedia. The list of added software included programs used for working with documents, playing music as well as other server utilities, firewall security, and printer/scanner tools.

The first release confirmed to be independently developed was version 1.0.2007 released in 2007. It added full capability to work with partitions using the NTFS file structure via GParted. This release was thoroughly tested on several old computers using only 16MB of RAM.

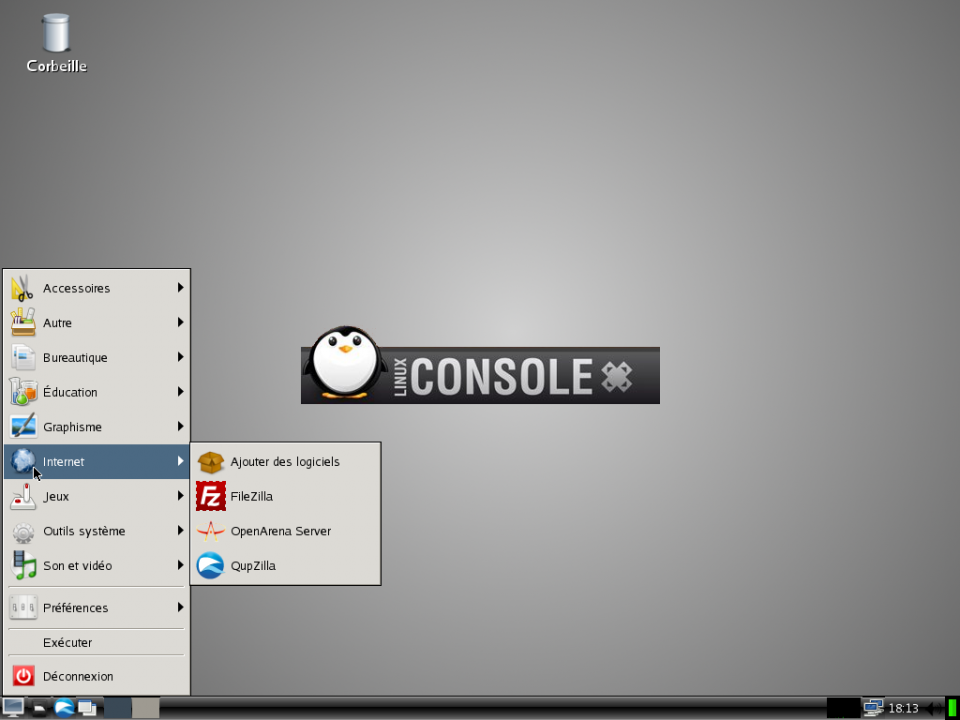
Screenshot of LXDE on LinuxConsole OS from the developer website

Release 1.0.2009 came out in 2009 with four distinctive versions. The first was a 200MB ISO image made for older computers low on hard drive space, and came with a lightweight desktop and file manager. The next was a CD image with a mid-sized desktop that added more features and games. The DVD version was complete with all the features included. Lastly, there was something available called the "Jukebox", where users could custom build their own ISO and transfer the image to USB with support for UNetbootin. This release was available via BitTorrent.

The release of 1.0.2010 in 2010 had the goal of being easy to use as a game console. Module management was completely rewritten to load all modules at once without any cache. It switched from Dash to Bash, and initramfs to initrd, allowing for a very fast boot time of only 4 seconds when starting LXDE with a CD in VirtualBox. The default session was LXDE/PCManFM and IceWM/Rox Filer was an option. Wi-Fi connections could be configured with wicd.

The next major release was version 2.0 in 2013 with a fast boot, support for both new, and old video cards, Live CD and Live USB support, and the ability to dual-boot with Windows. The release came with some games including OpenTTD, Tux Paint, BZFlag, Neverball, Frozen Bubble, fooBillard, Freecraft, SuperTuxKart, and Teeworlds to name a few. This release included support for Deb packages as well. Although this release is deprecated, it can still be downloaded via the mirror link on the official website.

The release of version 2.3 in 2014 saw the advancement of the lightweight opkg package manager. It offered a gui to install and run stable source packages in different categories including games, office, system, and education. The goal of this version was to run on old computers, and turn them into gaming consoles. It could work on systems with as little as 256MB of RAM, and had both PAE, and non-PAE versions available. It included support for multiple languages. This release is deprecated as well. The information page on the official website still exists, but the download links are no longer active. However, version 2.3 is still available via the mirror site.

Version 2.4 was released in 2015, has a tool for installing third-party software, and it comes with the LXDE lightweight desktop. It is compatible with Debian packages, and it can run apt-get.

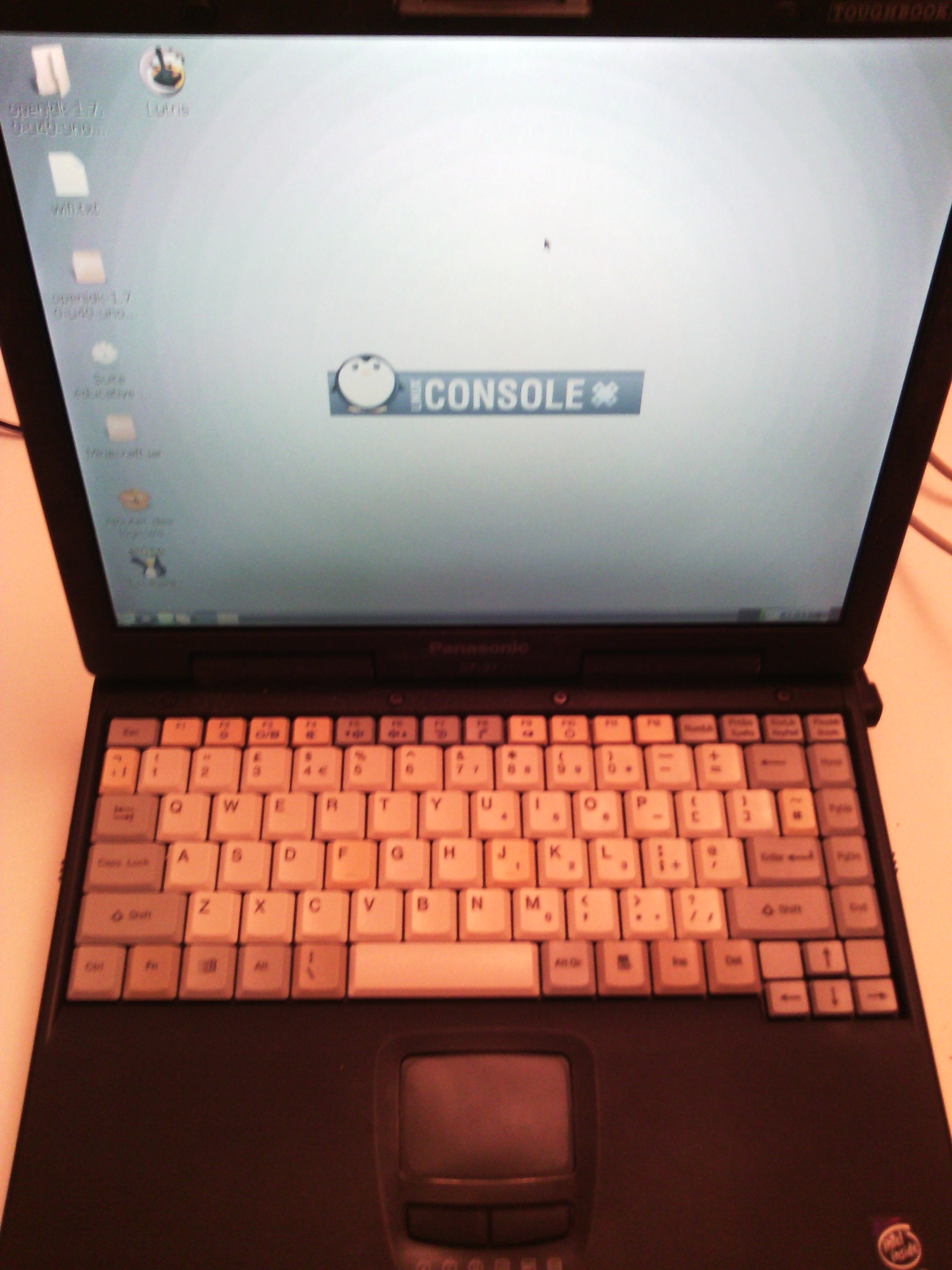
LinuxConsole 2.4 on a laptop with 180MB RAM and a Pentium II processor

The LinuxConsole 2.5 release added support for UEFI, and the 32bit version was the last one to support non-PAE hardware.

LinuxConsole 2018 was released in December, 2017 with the updated ability to manage bluetooth devices, as well as the ease of configuring Wi-Fi networks.

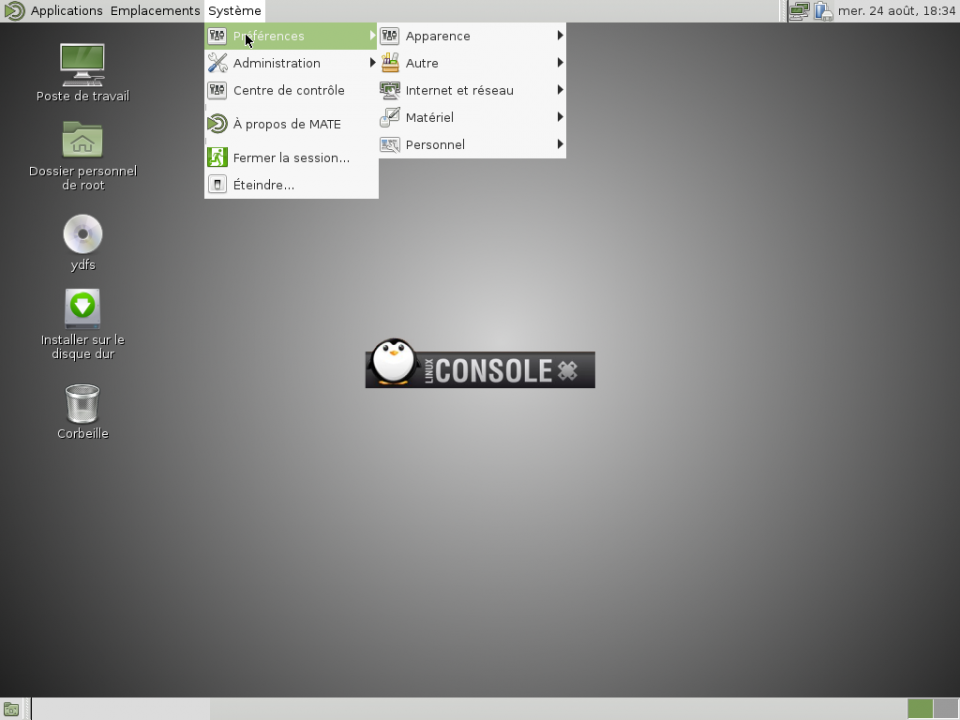
Screenshot of Mate on LinuxConsole 2019 from the developer website

LinuxConsole 2019 supports installing an extensible set of software via modules, and some Windows software or games with the Wine virtual emulator. Additional software or games can be installed using the opkg and APT package managers.

LinuxConsole 2022 has been released in 2022.

== System requirements ==
- 32bit or 64bit PC with i586 x86 or x86-64 architecture.
- PAE compliant CPU. (Version 2.5 may be used for non-PAE CPU.)
- 500MB RAM (Listed RAM usages are based on version 2.4 requirements.)
  - 128MB for basic usage on the non-PAE versions.
  - 500MB for normal browser usage.
  - 1GB recommended for graphics intensive programs such as SuperTuxKart
- Can be installed to hard disk via live CD, live USB, Windows install, or net install.

== See also ==
- Comparison of Linux distributions
- Lightweight Linux distribution
- List of Linux distributions
- List of live CDs
