= Nanolinux =

Lightweight Linux distribution

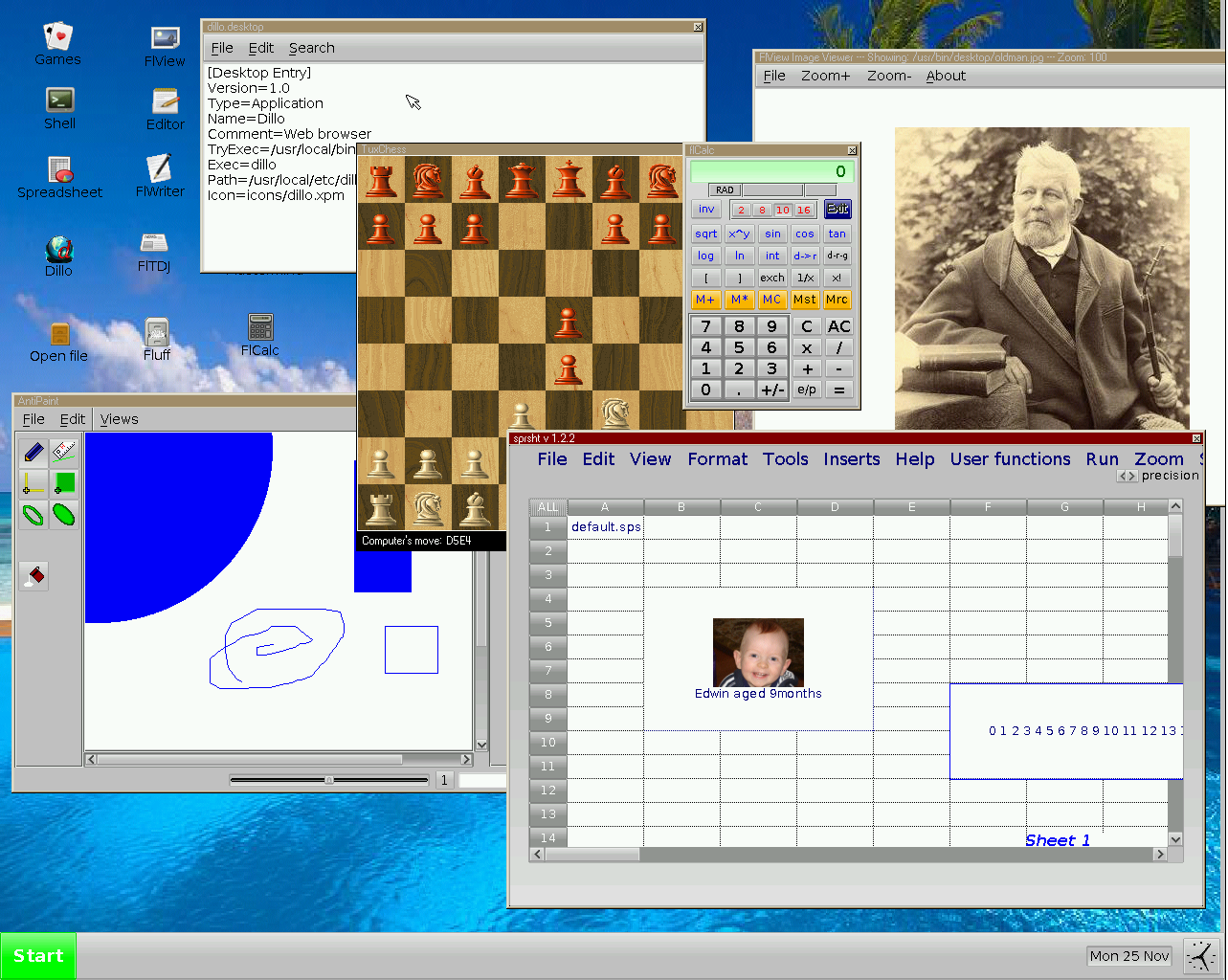
- Nanolinux 1.2
- Working state: Discontinued
- Source model: Open source
- Latest release: 1.3 / April 5, 2015; 10 years ago
- Latest preview: n/a
- Available in: English
- Platforms: x86, x86 64
- Kernel type: Monolithic Linux kernel
- Default user interface: BusyBox, SLWM
- License: Free software licenses (mainly GPL)
- Official website: sourceforge.net/projects/nanolinux/

NanoLinux is an open source, free and very lightweight Linux distribution that requires only 14 MB of disk space including tiny versions of the most common desktop applications and several games. It is based on the Core version of the Tiny Core Linux distribution and uses Busybox, Nano-X instead of X.Org, FLTK 1.3.x as the default GUI toolkit, and SLWM (super-lightweight window manager). The included applications are mainly based on FLTK.

== Applications included in the distribution ==
Nanolinux includes several lightweight applications, including:

- Dillo graphical web browser
- FlWriter word processor
- Sprsht spreadsheet application
- FLTDJ personal information manager
- AntiPaint painting application
- Fluff file manager
- NXterm terminal emulator
- Flcalc calculator
- FlView image viewer
- Fleditor text editor
- FlChat IRC client
- FlMusic CD player
- FlRadio internet radio
- Webserver, mount tool, system statistics, package install utility.

The distribution also includes several games, such as Tuxchess, Checkers, NXeyes, Mastermind, Sudoku and Blocks. Support for TrueType fonts and UTF-8 is also provided. Nanolinux is distributed as Live CD ISO images, installation on flash disk and hard disk is documented on its Wiki pages.

== System requirements ==
Minimal configuration: The Live CD version without swapfile requires 64 MB of RAM and 14 MB of disk space.

== See also ==
- Comparison of Linux live distributions
- Lightweight Linux distribution
- List of Linux distributions that run from RAM
