= Austrumi Linux =

- Austrumi logo
- Developer: Andrejs Meinerts
- OS family: Linux (Unix-like)
- Working state: Current
- Source model: Open source
- Latest release: 4.9.3 / April 5, 2024; 2 years ago
- Kernel type: Linux (Monolithic)
- License: Various
- Official website: cyti.latgola.lv/ruuni/

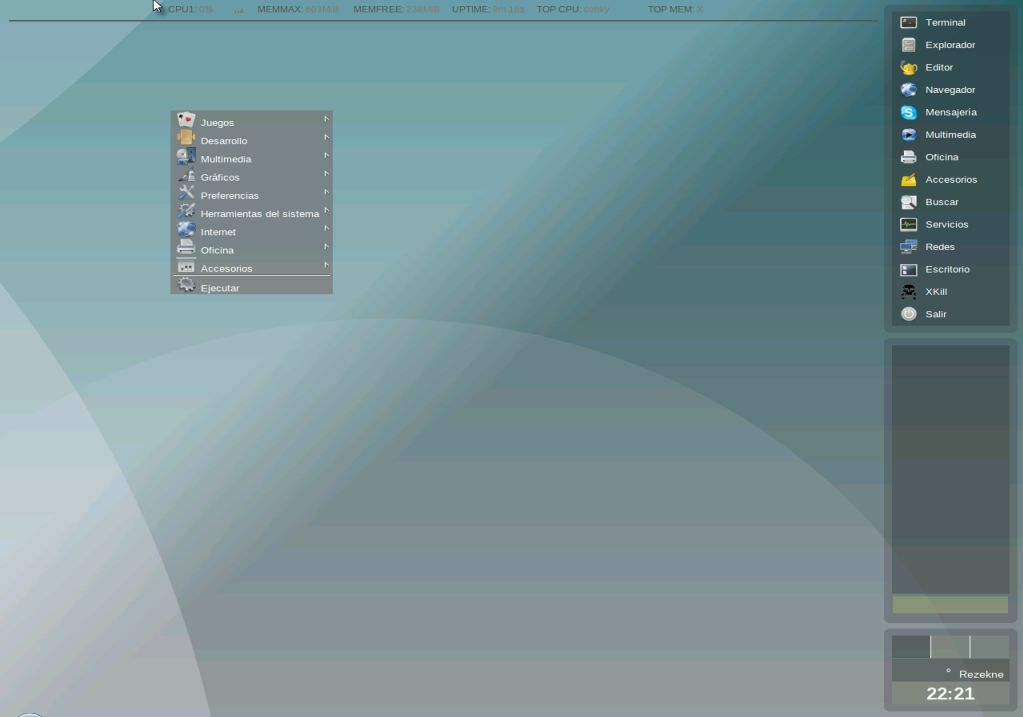
desktop

Austrumi (Austrum Latvijas Linukss) is a bootable live CD Linux distribution based on Slackware. It was created and is actively maintained by a group from the Latgale region of Latvia. The entire operating system and all the applications run from RAM, making Austrumi faster than larger distributions that must read from a disk, and allowing the boot medium to be removed after the operating system has booted.

== See also ==
- Comparison of Linux Live Distros
- Lightweight Linux distribution
- List of Linux distributions that run from RAM
