= ArchBang =

Linux distribution

GreenBANG

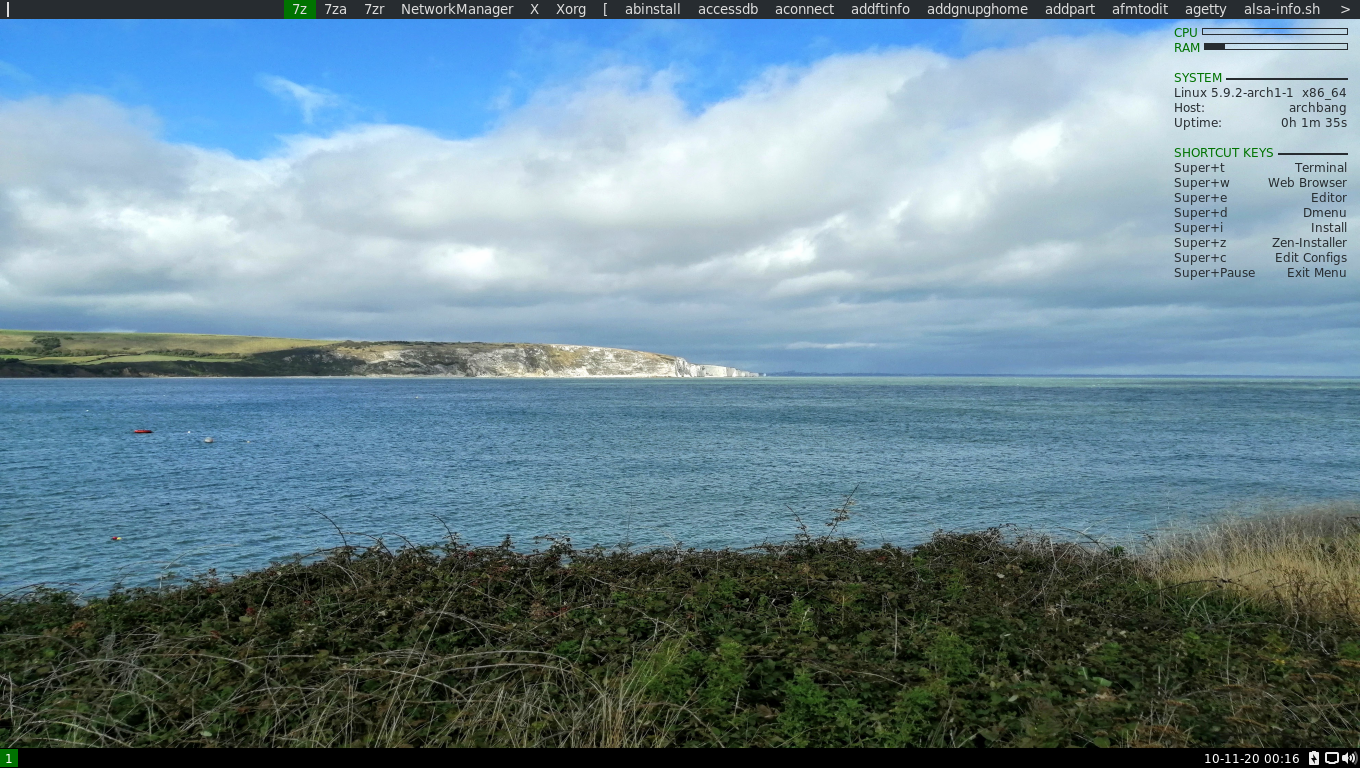
- GreenBANG Linux 0111
- Developer: Stan McLaren
- OS family: Unix-like (Linux kernel)
- Working state: Current
- Source model: Open source
- Latest release: (Rolling release)
- Marketing target: General purpose
- Available in: English
- Update method: Pacman
- Package manager: Pacman
- Supported platforms: x86-64
- Kernel type: Monolithic (Linux)
- Userland: GNU
- Default user interface: Mango
- License: GNU General Public License
- Official website: archbang.org

ArchBang Linux, also briefly known as GreenBANG, is a simple lightweight rolling release Linux distribution based on a minimal Arch Linux operating system with the i3 tiling window manager, previously using the Openbox stacking window manager. ArchBang is especially suitable for high performance on old or low-end hardware with limited resources. ArchBang's aim is to provide a simple out-of-the-box Arch-based Linux distribution with a pre-configured i3 desktop suite, adhering to Arch principles.

ArchBang has also been recommended as a fast installation method for people who have experience installing Arch Linux but want to avoid the more demanding default installation of Arch Linux when reinstalling it on another PC.

== History ==
Inspired by CrunchBang Linux (which was derived from Debian), ArchBang was originally conceived and founded in a forum thread posted on the CrunchBang Forums by Willensky Aristide (a.k.a. Will X TrEmE). Aristide wanted a rolling release with the Openbox setup that CrunchBang came with. Arch Linux provided the light configurable rolling release system that was needed as a base for the Openbox desktop. With the encouragement and help of many in the CrunchBang community, and the addition of developer Pritam Dasgupta (a.k.a. sHyLoCk), the project began to take form. The goal was to make Arch Linux look like CrunchBang.

As of April 16, 2012, the new project leader is Stan McLaren.

In July 2025, McLaren announced that ArchBang would be renamed to GreenBANG due to concerns about potential legal action from Arch Linux over trademark laws.However, the name has been since reverted to ArchBang in November 2025.

== Installation ==
ArchBang is available as an x86-64 ISO file for live CD installation or installed on a USB flash drive. The live CD is designed to allow the user to test the operating system prior to installation.

ArchBang comes with a modified Arch Linux graphical installation script for installation and also provides a simple, easy to follow, step-by-step installation guide.

== Reception ==
Jesse Smith reviewed the ArchBang 2011 for DistroWatch Weekly:

The ISO for ArchBang's live disc weighs in at approximately 530 MB and, after showing us a boot menu, it boots into an Openbox environment in under a minute. The default desktop is dark, the background mostly black. A task switcher sits at the bottom of the screen and a Conky panel displays resource usage information to the right-hand side of the display. Right-clicking on the desktop brings up a menu that allows us to launch applications (including the installer), change settings or logout/shutdown.

Smith also reviewed ArchBang 2013.09.01.

Whitson Gordon from Lifehacker wrote review about ArchBang in 2011:

ArchBang has all of that, without the arduous installation process. ArchBang, like most other Linux distributions, comes on a Live CD. Just boot it up, and you'll head straight into a desktop, from which you can try out the system or install it directly to your computer. The installation is actually very similar to Arch's, only without the config file editing, the driver installations, or the pain of running startx and seeing nothing happen. You just pick your drives, hit the install button, and in five minutes, you're done. Of course, you can edit the config files if you so desire—you just don't have to.
