= Damn Small Linux =

Lightweight, desktop-oriented Linux distribution

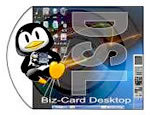

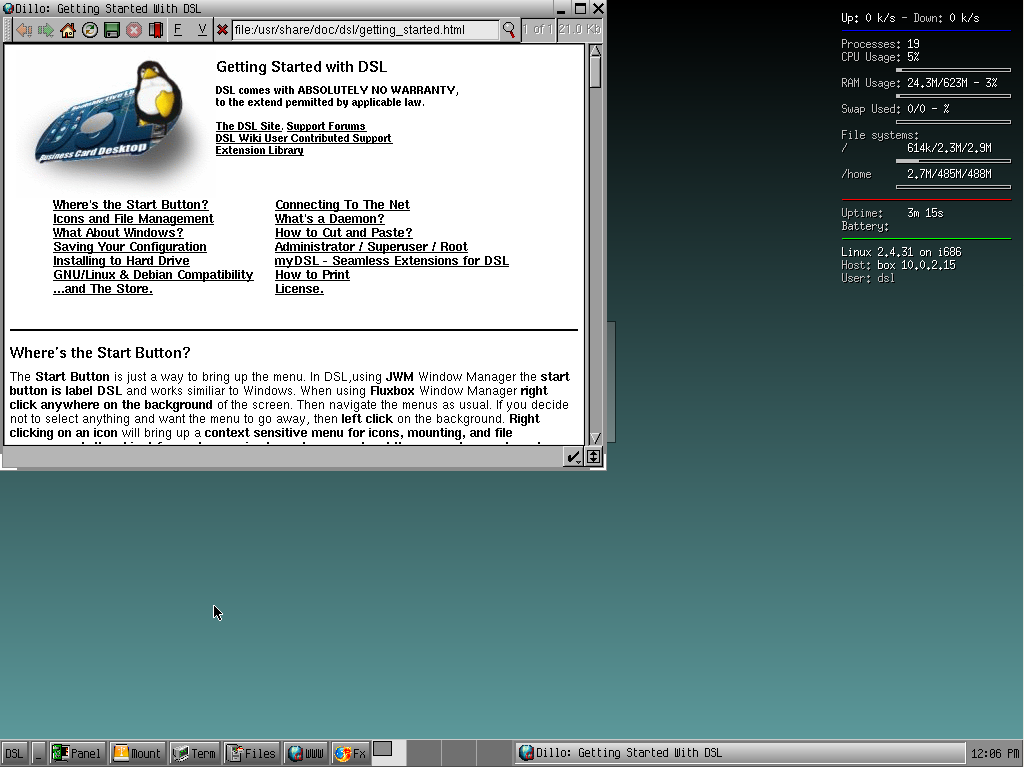
- Damn Small Linux 4.4.10
- Developer: John Andrews, et al.
- OS family: Linux (Unix-like)
- Working state: Current
- Source model: Open source
- Initial release: April 13, 2005; 20 years ago
- Latest release: 4.4.10 / 18 November 2008; 16 years ago
- Latest preview: 2024 RC 7 / 18 September 2024; 13 months ago
- Kernel type: Monolithic Linux kernel
- Default user interface: Fluxbox, JWM
- License: Free software licenses (mainly GPL)
- Official website: www.damnsmalllinux.org

Damn Small Linux demonstration

Damn Small Linux (DSL) is a Linux distribution for the x86 family of personal computers. It is free and open-source software under the terms of the GNU GPL and other free and open-source licenses. DSL is designed to run graphical user interface applications on older PC hardware, but the exact specifications required differ significantly between the original version and the modern version.

== History ==
DSL was originally conceived and maintained by John Andrews. For five years the community included Robert Shingledecker who created the MyDSL system, DSL Control Panel and other features. After issues with the main developers, Shingledecker was, by his account, exiled from the project. He currently continues his work on Tiny Core Linux which he created in April 2008.

DSL was originally based on Model-K, a 22 MB stripped-down version of Knoppix, but soon after was based on Knoppix proper, allowing much easier remastering and improvements. The distribution is now based on Debian and antiX.

=== Original DSL ===
Originally, DSL supported machines with as little as a 486 microprocessor and 8 megabytes (MB) of random-access memory (RAM). The live CD itself was only 50 MB in size. What originally began as an experiment to see how much software could fit in 50 MB eventually became a full Linux distribution. It could be installed on storage media with small capacities, like bootable business cards, USB flash drives, various memory cards, and Zip drives.

This version of DSL was last developed in 2012, with its last stable release in 2008.

=== Modern DSL ===
In 2024, a release candidate for DSL was released, the first in twelve years. This newer version has rather higher system requirements, and a size limit of 700 MB, but still supports older 32-bit systems. This version is based on antiX rather than Knoppix.

== System requirements ==
DSL is designed to primarily support x86 PCs. The minimum system requirements for the older version were a 486 processor and 8 MB of RAM. DSL has been demonstrated by browsing the web with Dillo, running simple games, and playing music on systems with a 486 processor and 16 MB of RAM. The system requirements are higher for running Mozilla Firefox and optional add-ons such as the OpenOffice.org office suite.

== Features ==
Version 4.4.10 of DSL, released November 18, 2008, included the following software:

- Text editors: Beaver, Nano, Vim
- File managers: DFM, emelFM
- Graphics: mtPaint (raster graphics editor), xzgv (image viewer)
- Multimedia: gphone, XMMS with MPEG-1 and Video CD (VCD) support
- Office: Siag Office (spreadsheet program), Ted (word processor) with spell checker, Xpdf (viewer for Portable Document Format (PDF) documents), AbiWord, Gnumeric
- Internet:
  - Web browsers: Dillo, Firefox, Netrik
  - Sylpheed (E-mail client)
  - naim (AOL Instant Messenger (AIM), ICQ, and IRC client)
  - AxyFTP (File Transfer Protocol (FTP) client), BetaFTPD (FTP server)
  - Monkey (web server)
  - Server Message Block (SMB) client
  - Rdesktop (Remote Desktop Protocol (RDP) client, Virtual Network Computing (VNC) viewer
- Others: Dynamic Host Configuration Protocol (DHCP) client, Secure Shell (SSH) and secure copy protocol (SCP) client and server; Point-to-Point Protocol (PPP), Point-to-Point Protocol over Ethernet (PPPoE), Asymmetric Digital Subscriber Line (ADSL) support; FUSE, Network File System (NFS), SSH Filesystem (SSHFS) support; UnionFS; generic and Ghostscript printing support; PC card, Universal Serial Bus (USB), Wi-Fi support; calculator, games, system monitor; many command-line tools

DSL has built-in scripts to download and install Advanced Packaging Tool (APT). Once APT is enabled, a user can install packages from Debian's repositories. Also, DSL hosts software ranging from large applications like OpenOffice.org and GNU Compiler Collection (GCC), to smaller ones such as aMSN, by means of the MyDSL system, which allows convenient one-click download and installing of software. Files hosted on MyDSL are called extensions. As of June 2008, the MyDSL servers were hosting over 900 applications, plugins, and other extensions.

== Boot options ==
DSL boot options, called cheat codes

Boot options are also called "cheat codes" in DSL. Automatic hardware detection may fail, or the user may want to use something other than the default settings (language, keyboard, VGA, fail-safe graphics, text mode...). DSL allows the user to enter one or more cheat codes at the boot prompt. If nothing is entered, DSL will boot with the default options. Cheat codes affect many auto-detection and hardware options. Many cheat codes also affect the GUI. The list of cheat codes can be seen at boot time and also at the DSL Wiki.

== The MyDSL system ==
MyDSL is handled and maintained mostly by Robert Shingledecker and hosted by many organizations, such as ibiblio and Belgium's BELNET. There are two areas of MyDSL: regular and testing. The regular area contains extensions that have been proven stable enough for everyday use and is broken down into different areas such as apps, net, system, and uci (Universal Compressed ISO - Extensions in .uci format are mounted as a separate file system to minimize RAM use). The testing area is for newly submitted extensions that theoretically work well enough but may have any number of bugs.

== Versions and ports ==
=== Release timeline ===
Release history
Version	Date
1.0	2005-04-13
1.1	2005-05-05
1.2	2005-06-07
1.3	2005-07-14
1.4	2005-08-02
1.5	2005-09-06
2.0	2005-11-22
2.4	2006-05-16
3.0	2006-06-20
3.1	2006-11-29
3.2	2007-01-18
3.3	2007-04-03
3.4	2007-07-03
4.0	2007-10-23
4.1	2007-12-02
4.2	2007-12-18
4.3	2008-04-22
4.4	2008-06-09
2024-RC7	2024-06-08

=== Ports and derivatives ===
DSL was ported to the Xbox video game console as X-DSL. X-DSL requires a modified Xbox. It can run as a Live CD or be installed to the Xbox hard drive. Users have also run X-DSL from a USB flash drive, using the USB adaptor included with Phantasy Star Online, which plugs into the memory card slot and includes one USB 1.1 port. X-DSL boots into a X11-based GUI; the Xbox controller can be used to control the mouse pointer and enter text using a virtual keyboard. X-DSL has a Fluxbox desktop, with programs for E-mail, web browsing, word processing and playing music. X-DSL can be customized by downloading extensions from the same MyDSL servers as DSL.

Linux distributions derived from Damn Small Linux include Hikarunix, used for a CD image that runs the game of Go released in 2005, and Damn Vulnerable Linux.

== Live USB ==
A Live USB of Damn Small Linux can be created manually or with applications like UNetbootin.

== Status ==
Due to disagreements and irreconcilable differences among the project's originators and main developers, DSL development seemed to be at a standstill for a long time, and the future of the project was uncertain, much to the dismay of many of the users.

On July 8, 2012, John Andrews (the original developer) announced that a new release was being developed. The DSL website, including the forums which were once inaccessible, were back, as well. The first RC of the new 4.11 was released on August 3, 2012, followed by a second one on September 26.

On February 1, 2024, DSL 2024 Alpha 1 was announced and released on the project's webpage. May 22nd 2024 the DSL forum has a post "Release Candidate 4 Now Available"

== See also ==
- Comparison of Linux distributions
- Lightweight Linux distribution
- List of Linux distributions
- List of Linux distributions that run from RAM
- Tiny Core Linux, the project Robert Shingledecker began
