= Gregory Haerr =

American businessman

Gregory R. Haerr
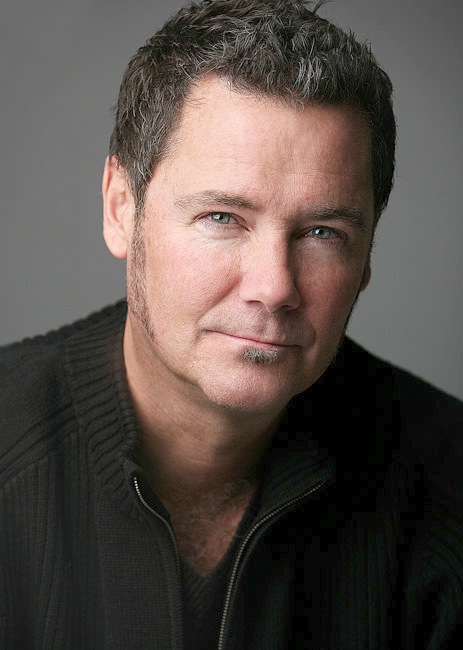
- Gregory R. Haerr
- Born: September 30, 1957 (age 68); La Jolla, California
- Occupation: Entrepreneur
- Website: www.gregoryhaerr.com

Gregory Haerr (born September 30, 1957) is an American entrepreneur and the founder and CEO of Century Software, a provider of Windows and Linux based terminal emulation software. Haerr founded the company in 1982, after having moved from his hometown of La Jolla to Salt Lake City in 1981. Haerr is the oldest of seven siblings.

Haerr earned a B.A. in computer science from UCSD in 1980, with minors in accounting and music performance. After moving to Salt Lake City, he consulted for various firms writing custom software. He started Century Software after writing a small file transfer utility for a friend.

== Land Holding and Development ==
In 1994, Haerr started building a land banking development business using the profits from Century Software. Today, these companies own land and developments in Utah, Washington, and Idaho. TP Development, Inc. is the developer of Anderson Ranch Phases 5, 6, and 7 in Grantsville, Utah.

== Microwindows ==
Haerr's experience with Windows and UNIX operating systems branched out to the newer, free Linux operating system. In 1999, he wrote a free graphical windowing system called Microwindows that could be used on small, embedded Linux systems. This system, because of its small size and free cost, enabled many others to build their own applications in the emerging PDA and mobile marketplace.

== Secret Millionaire ==
In December 2008, Haerr joined the cast of the FOX reality series Secret Millionaire in Las Vegas, where he gave away $150,000 of his own money to deserving people and organizations, including extreme wheelchair athlete Aaron Fotheringham.
