= Absolute Linux =

- Developer: Jordan Tyler Burchett
- OS family: Linux (Unix-like)
- Working state: Current
- Source model: Primarily open source
- Initial release: 2007
- Latest release: 20240602 / 2 June 2024
- Marketing target: Netbooks, older systems and general use
- Available in: English
- Package manager: XPKGTOOL
- Supported platforms: x86-64
- Kernel type: Monolithic
- Default user interface: IceWM
- License: GPL and various others
- Official website: absolutelinux.org

Absolute Linux is a lightweight Linux distribution that works on older hardware and is based on Slackware Linux. The client is designed for everyday use (internet, multimedia, documents). Absolute Linux's default window and file managers are IceWM and ROX-Filer. Some of the programs offered by default include: GIMP, LibreOffice, Firefox, Xfburn, p7zip, qBittorrent, and Vivaldi Many script utilities are included with Absolute Linux to aid with configuration and maintenance of the system.

Absolute Linux uses a graphical frontend to XPKGTOOL. Absolute Linux also bundles Gsplat, a Graphical frontend to Slapt-get which works similarly to Apt-get.

On 15 December 2024, the founding maintainer, Paul Sherman, announced that Absolute Linux is no longer in development. In early November 2025, the website had this update: "My name is Jordan Tyler Burchett, founder of eXybit Technologies and the new maintainer of Absolute Linux......"

== See also ==
- IceWM
- Lightweight Portable Security
- Lightweight Linux distribution
- Slackware
- Slapt-get
- Linux distribution
