= Comparison of lightweight Linux distributions =

Linux distribution with low resource requirements

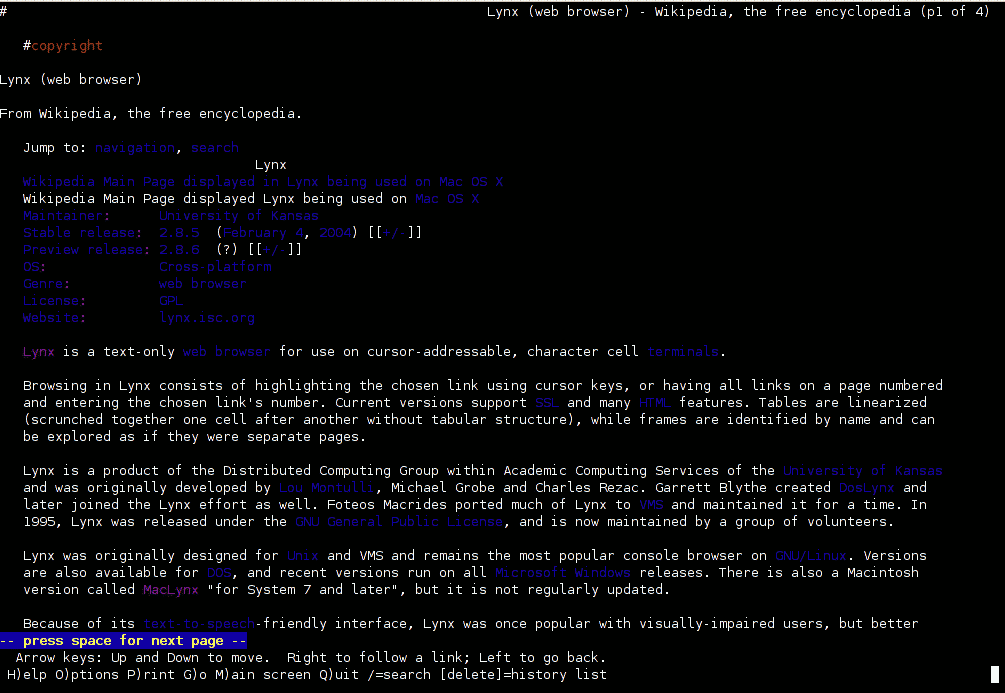
In the extreme case, a user can use a computer without a GUI and even browse the internet in a terminal, without images, in Lynx, on a weak computer.

A light-weight Linux distribution is a Linux distribution that uses lower memory and processor-speed requirements than a more "feature-rich" Linux distribution. The lower demands on hardware ideally result in a more responsive machine, and allow devices with fewer system resources (e.g. older or embedded hardware) to be used productively. The lower memory and processor-speed requirements are achieved by avoiding software bloat, i.e. by leaving out features that are perceived to have little or no practical use or advantage, or for which there is no or low demand.

The perceived weight of a Linux distribution is strongly influenced by the desktop environment included with that distribution. Accordingly, many Linux distributions offer a choice of editions. For example, Canonical hosts several variants ("flavors") of the Ubuntu distribution that include desktop environments other than the default GNOME. These variants include the Xubuntu and Lubuntu distributions for the comparatively light-weight Xfce and LXDE / LXQt desktop environments.

The demands that a desktop environment places on a system may be seen in a comparison of the minimum system requirements of Ubuntu 10.10 and Lubuntu 10.10 desktop editions, where the only significant difference between the two was their desktop environment. Ubuntu 10.10 included the Unity desktop, which had minimum system requirements of a 2 GHz processor with 2 GB of RAM, while Lubuntu 10.10 included LXDE, which required at least a Pentium II with 128 MB of RAM.

== Overview of some distributions ==
- ArchBang – inspired by CrunchBang Linux but based on the Arch Linux distribution instead of Debian.
- DebianDog - Debian Live CD shaped after Puppy Linux. It is packaged with JWM and IceWM, or Openbox and Xfce. Debian structure and behaviour are untouched.
- LinuxConsole - a lightweight system for old computers made to be easy for youth and casual users.
- MiniOS - a debian based live system with various Desktop Environments.
- Parabola GNU/Linux-libre - an Arch-based lightweight system endorsed by the Free Software Foundation.
- Nura – a derivative of Alpine Linux designed primarily for smartphones
- Arch-based distros: Mabox, Archcraft, and Archman.

== Comparison ==
Distribution	Minimum system requirements	Desktop / Window manager	Based on	Package manager	Image size	Purpose	Latest release year	Maintainer	Created	Founder
Absolute Linux	CPU: x86-64 RAM: 64 MB (1 GB+ recommended)	iceWM	Slackware	XPKGTOOL	2264 MB	Desktop	2023	Absolute Linux Team	2007	Absolute Linux Team
Alpine Linux	RAM: 128 MB (256 MB to install)	None by default	BusyBox, musl	APK	8 MB (container), 130 MB (disk)	Lightweight desktop, security	2026	Alpine Linux development team	2010	LEAF Project members
antiX	CPU: x86 Non-PAE (to v23.2), x86-64 RAM: 256 MB	IceWM, Fluxbox, JWM, herbstluftwm	MEPIS < Debian	Synaptic	700 MB Base, 1000 MB Full, 310 MB Core	Desktop, portability (with persistence)	2026	Anticapitalista	2007	Anticapitalista
Bodhi Linux	CPU: 32-bit, 500 MHz (non-PAE); RAM: 512 MB; Drive: 5 GB	Moksha (a fixed E17)	Ubuntu < Debian	APT	575 MB (Standard), 1024 MB (AppPack)	Desktop	2023	Bodhi Linux team	2011	Bodhi Linux team
BunsenLabs Linux	RAM: 256 MB to run X 1 GB for Firefox; 2+ GB recommended	OpenBox	Debian Stable	Synaptic, APT, dpkg	674 MB (i386, no PAE) 1100 MB (i386, AMD64)	LiveCD, LiveDVD, lightweight desktop	2026	Core maintainers	2015	Core maintainers
CrunchBang Linux	CPU: x86 or ARM RAM: 1 GB Drive: 2.1 GB.	OpenBox	Debian	dpkg	1600 MB	Lightweight Desktop	2013	Philip Newborough (corenominal)	2010	Philip Newborough (corenominal)
CRUX	CPU: x86-64 (AMD Athlon 64, Intel Core, Intel Atom) or newer processors RAM: 192 MB (2017)	OpenBox	-	pkgutils	1773 MB	BSD / experienced users, lightweight	2025	Core maintainers	2002	Per Lidén
Damn Small Linux	CPU: 486dx RAM: 8 MB	Fluxbox, JWM	—	APT (optional)	700 MB	Desktop	2024		2005	John Andrews, et al.
Elive	CPU: 32 bit 500 MHz (non-PAE) RAM: 512 MB	Enlightenment	Debian	APT	3000 MB	Desktop	2024	Samuel F. Baggen	2005	Samuel F. Baggen
Gentoo Linux	RAM: 32 MB	None by default, but you can install any	—	Portage	400 MB	Desktop, server, source-based, advanced	Rolling release		2002	Daniel Robbins
GoboLinux	RAM: 128 MB RAM 1000+ MB for full graphic CPU: x86_64	Awesome	—		1900 MB	Desktop	2025	GoboLinux team	2003	Hisham Muhammad and André Detsch
Knoppix	RAM: 32 MB text, 512 MB LXDE. 1 GB recommended CPU: 486	LXDE	Debian	dpkg	701 MB	Live	2022		2000	Klaus Knopper
Lightweight Portable Security		iceWM	Arch Linux		390 MB	Secure live operating system	2021	United States Department of Defense	2011	United States Department of Defense
Linux Lite	CPU: Intel/AMD 1GHz dual core 64bit RAM: 2 GB (2025) Drive: 20 GB	Xfce	Ubuntu LTS	APT	2900 MB	Desktop (Windows users)	2026	Jerry Bezencon	2013	Jerry Bezencon
Lubuntu	RAM: 384 to 800 MB Drive: 4,3 GB	LXQt	Ubuntu	APT	3300 MB	Lightweight desktop	2026	Lubuntu team	2009	Lubuntu team
LXLE	RAM: 1 GB (2022) CPU: 64-bit (2022)	LXDE	Ubuntu LTS	APT	1300 MB	Older computers, intermediate users	2022	LXLE team	2012	Ronnie
Nanolinux	RAM: 64 MB (2017) CPU: 486	SLWM on Nano-X	Tiny Core Linux; MicroCore Linux with BusyBox.		19 MB	Lightweight, Runs on RAM, advanced	2015	Georg Potthast	—	Georg Potthast
OpenWrt	CPU: x86 and over 50 router platforms RAM: 32 MB (2018) 64 MB recommended	None (headless server) - Includes LuCI admin UI	BusyBox, musl	opkg	6 MB	SOHO Routers	2026	OpenWrt developers	2004	
PCLinuxOS	CPU: 64-bit (from 2016) RAM: 2 GB (2020)	KDE, MATE, XFCE	Mandrake	APT-RPM	1000-3800 MB	Live	Rolling release	Bill Reynolds	2003	Bill Reynolds
Peppermint Linux OS	CPU: x86_64 RAM: 1 GB. 4 GB recommended	XFCE	Debian, Devuan	APT	1332 MB	Desktop	2025	Peppermint, LLC	2010	Peppermint, LLC
Porteus	CPU: 32 bit RAM: 36 MB	(multiple)	Slackware	USM	260 MB (LxQt)	Lightweight, portable (with persistence)	2023	Porteus	2010	Fanthom
Puppy Linux	RAM: 256 MB (2017)	JWM-2.3.2	Ubuntu LTS from Puppy 6	Puppy Package Manager	1100 MB (TrixiePup64)	Portable (with persistence), lightweight	2023	Puppy Foundation	2003	Barry Kauler
Q4OS	CPU: Intel / AMD 64bit RAM: 512 MB (TDE) / 2 GB (Plasma) Hard drive: 6 GB (TDE) / 8 GB (Plasma)	Plasma/Trinity	Debian	APT	1418 MB (TDE) / 1782 MB (Plasma)	Lightweight desktop	2026	Q4OS team	2013	Q4OS team
Salix OS	RAM: 512 MB CPU: Intel Pentium III 1 GHz Hard drive: 8 GB	MATE, KDE, Xfce, Fluxbox, Openbox	Slackware	slapt-get	613 MB (Fluxbox), 852 MB (MATE live)	Desktop	2022	George Vlahavas	2009	George Vlahavas, Thorsten Mühlfelder and Cyrille Pontvieux
Slax	RAM:256MB without web browser	KDE till Slax 8 Fluxbox since Slax 9	Slackware till Slax 8 Debian from Slax 9	APT	226 MB	Portable	2023	Tomas Matejicek	2002	Tomas Matejicek
SliTaz	RAM: 24 MB loram-cdrom 128 MB loram 256 MB standard	Openbox	—	TazPkg	50 MB	Portable. Live (no persistence by default)	Rolling Release	dev team	2008	Christophe Lincoln
SparkyLinux	CPU: Intel/AMD 64bit	LXQt, MATE, Xfce and KDE	debian LTS	APT	1900 MB LXQt; KDE 2100 MB	Lightweight desktop	2026	SparkyLinux team	2012	SparkyLinux team
Tiny Core Linux	CPU: 486DX RAM: 46 MB	FLTK/FLWM, none, or you can install any		appbrowser (GUI) tce (CLI)	11 MB (Core), 16 MB (TinyCore), 106 MB (CorePlus)	Portable, advanced	2026	Tiny Core team	2009	Robert Shingledecker
Tiny SliTaz	CPU: 386SX RAM: 4 MB 8 MB recommended	None (VNC viewer or headless server)	SliTaz	Tiny SliTaz WEB site	Down to 800 KB, likely a 1.44 MB floppy	Portable. Live (no persistence by default)	2021	dev team	2011(?)	Pascal Bellard
Trisquel Mini	RAM: 256 MB CPU: 64-bit CPU for latest version	LXDE	Ubuntu LTS	APT	1200 MB	Free software: desktop	2026	Rubén Rodríguez Pérez (quidam)	2005	Rubén Rodríguez Pérez (quidam)
TurnKey Linux Virtual Appliance Library	RAM: 256 MB 2017	None (headless server) - Includes Webmin admin UI	Debian (a minified base)	dpkg	212 MB (Core)	Lightweight headless server	2024	TurnKey Linux team	2008	Alon Swartz, Liraz Siri
VectorLinux Light	RAM: 64 MB Light edition 96 MB Standard 256MB Live	Several / IceWM	Slackware	slapt-get	618 MB	Desktop	2017	—	2001	—
Void Linux	CPU: ARMv6 Pentium 4 (SSE2) RAM: 520 MB Hard drive: 700 MB	Xfce, or none	—	XBPS	974 MB (i686, without desktop environment)	Desktop/embedded	2025 (rolling release)	Void Linux Team, Void Linux Community	2008	Juan Romero Pardines
Xubuntu	CPU: Intel/AMD 64bit RAM: 1 GB Hard drive: 8.6 GB	Xfce	Ubuntu	APT	1660 MB	Lightweight desktop	2026	Xubuntu team	2008	Xubuntu team
Zenwalk		Xfce	Slackware	netpkg	974 MB	Desktop	2024	development team	2004	Jean-Philippe Guillemin

== See also ==
- Just enough operating system
- Minimalism (computing)
- Software bloat
- Comparison of lightweight web browsers
- List of Linux distributions that run from RAM
- List of live CDs
