= Xzgv =

xzgv
- Developer: Various
- Stable release: 0.9.2 / September 3, 2017; 8 years ago
- Written in: C
- Operating system: Linux
- Type: Image viewer
- License: GNU General Public License
- Website: Official website

xzgv is a simple, small software utility that can be used for viewing digital images or pictures of several formats, e.g., JPEG, GIF, PNG, etc. xzgv is used on computers using a Unix-like operating system and the X Window System. Because xzgv is a fast, lightweight image viewer that is compatible with a large number of image formats, the viewer is popular on older, slower, resource-challenged computer systems. xzgv is a standard utility in the Damn Small Linux distribution, for example.

Xzgv was originally built as an X11-compatible clone of zgv by the same developer. The versions prior to 0.9 were based on the software toolkits GTK+ and Imlib 1.x. Most file formats are supported, and the thumbnails used are compatible with xv, zgv, and GIMP. Xzgv differs from other viewers in that it uses one window for both the file selector and viewer. xzgv incorporates a thumbnail-based file selector and is designed to be functional without using a mouse. The versions prior to 0.9 had full keyboard support, including advanced image tagging and external-command automation that were useful for scripting work. Xzgv is not an image editor, and much of its resource efficiency came from the decision to avoid any image modification support.

According to its man page, xzgv supports the following file formats: GIF, JPEG, PNG, PBM/PGM/PPM (collectively known as `PNM'), BMP, TGA (Targa), PCX, mrf, PRF, XBM (X bitmap files), XPM, TIFF, TIM (the Sony PlayStation), and XWD (X window dumps, as produced by the X Window utility xwd).

The source code for the utility is not under active development, but new versions are released every 2–3 years. The 0.9 release is missing much of the earlier releases' functionality and exists primarily as a start toward a version that does not depend on obsolete libraries.

== See also ==
- Comparison of image viewers
