= Telikin =

Telikin Elite Silver - 22"
- Developer: Venture 3 Systems
- Manufacturer: OEM
- Product family: Telikin
- Type: All-In-One desktop
- Introductory price: $1299 USD
- Operating system: Linux
- CPU: Intel Quad Core processor
- Memory: 4 GB DDR3 Memory
- Storage: 32 GB SSD
- Display: 22" touch screen
- Sound: Stereo 3W speakers with SRS technology
- Input: 6 USB ports, 4 USB 2.0, 2 USB 3.0
- Controller input: Wired Keyboard; Mouse; Touchscreen
- Camera: 1.0 MP
- Connectivity: Ethernet; 802.11 b/g/n
- Website: www.telikin.com

Telikin Touch - 18"
- Developer: Venture 3 Systems
- Manufacturer: OEM
- Product family: Telikin
- Type: All-In-One desktop
- Released: June 2011
- Introductory price: $999 USD
- Operating system: Linux
- CPU: Intel Quad Core processor, 2.4GHz
- Memory: 4 GB SDRAM; 6-in-1 card reader
- Storage: 16 GB SSD
- Display: 18.6" touch screen
- Graphics: NVIDIA Ion
- Sound: Stereo 3W speakers with SRS technology
- Input: 6 USB ports
- Controller input: Wired Keyboard; Mouse; Touchscreen
- Camera: 1.3 MP
- Connectivity: Ethernet; 802.11 b/g/n
- Website: www.telikin.com

Telikin Freedom - 15.6"
- Developer: Venture 3 Systems
- Manufacturer: OEM
- Product family: Telikin
- Type: Laptop computer
- Released: June 2015
- Introductory price: $999 USD
- Operating system: Linux
- CPU: Intel Quad Core Processor
- Memory: 4 GB SDRAM; SD card reader
- Storage: 32 GB Solid State Drive
- Display: 15.6" touch screen
- Sound: Stereo 3W speakers with SRS technology
- Input: 3 USB ports
- Controller input: Keyboard; Mouse; Touchscreen
- Camera: 1.3 MP
- Connectivity: Ethernet; 802.11 b/g/n
- Website: www.telikin.com

Telikin is a brand of touch-screen computer marketed primarily to senior citizens and those who may be uncomfortable or unable to access a traditional keyboard and mouse computer. The home screen features a panel of application buttons in large text on the side for quick access to news, video chat, email and Web The Telikin line of All-In-One desktop computers is developed and distributed by Venture 3 Systems based in Hatfield, Pennsylvania and founded by Fred Allegrezza. Venture 3 Systems launched the Telikin on Black Friday 2010.

== Models ==
Three models are available:

- Telikin Elite Silver 22" Touch Screen Computer
  - 21.6” (16:9), 1920 x 1080 touch panel
  - Intel Quad Core processor
  - 4 GB DDR3 memory
  - 32 GB solid state drive
  - 3W Stereo speakers with SRS technology
  - 1.0 MP webcam with microphone
  - 6 USB ports: 4 USB 2.0, 2 USB 3.0
  - 4 in 1 memory card reader (optional)
  - 1 HDMI out
  - Wireless 802.11 b/g/n
  - Large Print Keyboard and Mouse
- Telikin Touch, 18.6" Touch Screen Computer
  - 18.6 inch LCD touch screen
  - Intel Quad Core Processor
  - 4 GB SDRAM
  - 16 GB solid state drive
  - 1.3 MP webcam with microphone
  - 6 USB ports: 4 USB 2.0, 2 USB 3.0
  - 4 in 1 memory card reader
  - Wireless 802.11 b/g/n
  - Built-in stereo speakers
  - Wired keyboard and mouse
- Telikin Freedom, 15.6" Touch Screen Laptop Computer
  - 15.6 inch IPS LCD touch screen
  - Intel Quad Core Processor
  - 4 GB DRAM
  - 32 GB solid state drive
  - 1.3 MP webcam with microphone
  - 3 USB ports: 2 USB 3.0, 1 USB-C
  - SD card reader
  - Wireless 802.11 b/g/n
  - Built-in speakers
  - Wired mouse

== Software ==
The operating system of the Telikin is a distribution of Tiny Core Linux, which is covered under the GNU General Public License (the GPL), and includes drivers for the specific hardware platforms of the Telikin. In addition, the Telikin computer contains other copyrighted software also covered by the GPL or the GNU Lesser General Public License (the LGPL), such as news, video chat, e-mail, and web browsing. The Application System and User Interface for Telikin are original works. These works are not open source. A large print paperback manual accompanies each model which details how to connect the computer account setup, and use of applications.
