= Porteus (operating system) =

Portable operating system based on the Linux distribution Slackware

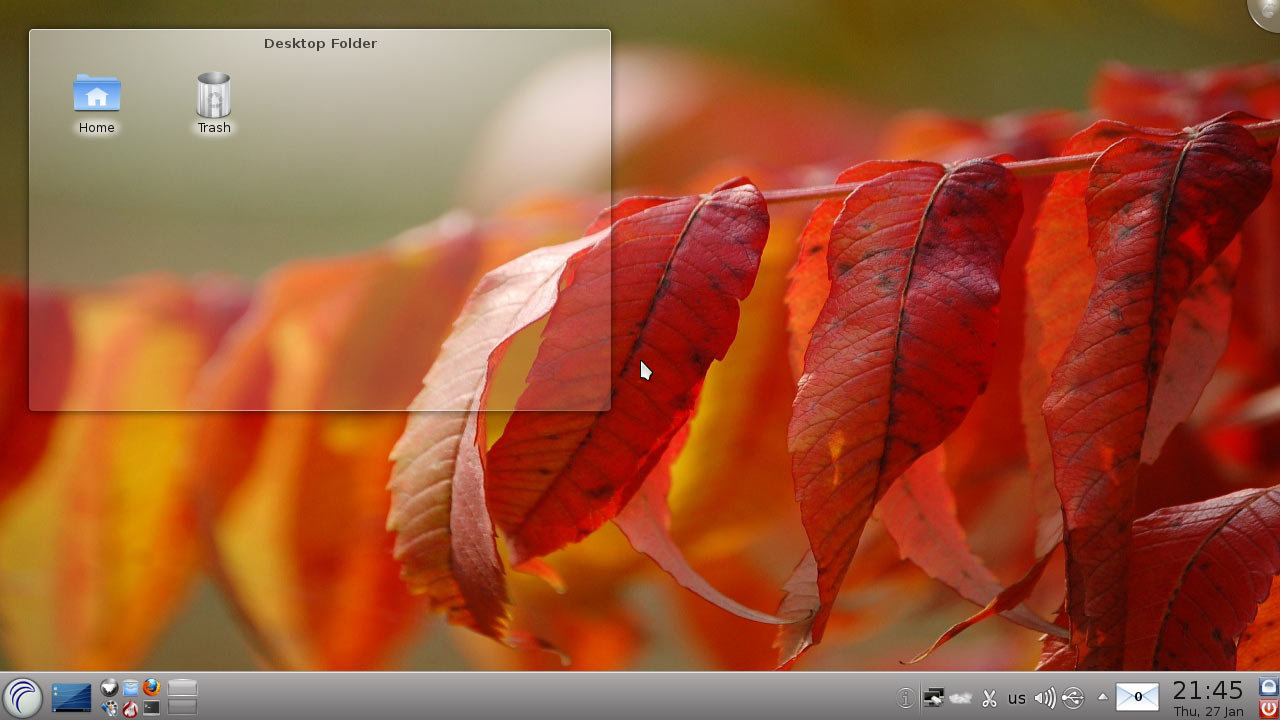
- Porteus with KDE 4
- Developer: Team Porteus
- OS family: Linux (Unix-like)
- Working state: Current
- Source model: Open source
- Latest release: 5.01 / 26 September 2023; 3 years ago
- Available in: All
- Package manager: USM
- Kernel type: Monolithic
- Userland: Slackware-current
- Default user interface: Cinnamon, GNOME KDE Plasma 5, LXDE, LXQt, MATE, Openbox, Xfce
- License: GPL and various licenses
- Official website: www.porteus.org

Porteus (formerly Slax Remix) is a portable operating system based on Slackware. It does not require installation and can be run from fixed and removable media, such as a USB flash drive or compact disc.

Porteus is available in 32-bit and 64-bit versions.

== Development ==
The Porteus project started out as "Slax Remix" at the beginning of 2010 and was started as a community project using the Zen kernel to improve and update the Slax OS.

The community agreed on the new name of the project, Porteus, which was named after 'Portability' and 'Proteus'. Proteus is a "Greek god of the sea, capable of changing his form at will", according to the naming announcement on the Porteus forum. The project leader commented on the name, "I find this name as a kind of synonym of 'flexibility'. We have portable (small) and flexible (modular) features included in one name: Porteus."

== Features ==
Porteus is based on a substantially modified and optimized version of the Linux Live Scripts. It can be run from a disc or USB stick (with changes saved onto the portable device) or installed on a hard drive. Porteus can even be installed within another system without the need to create a new partition.

Porteus is preloaded with a variety of software that the user selects before installing. The system is downloaded only after selecting various options from a menu including one of four window management systems, a browser and other features. Porteus uses a package manager utilizing slackware.

== Porteus Kiosk ==
Porteus Kiosk
- Developer: Porteus Solutions
- OS family: Linux
- Working state: Current
- Source model: Open source
- Initial release: 2012
- Latest release: 5.5.0 / March 27, 2023; 3 years ago
- Available in: English
- Userland: Gentoo Linux stable branch
- License: GPL and various licenses
- Official website: porteus-kiosk.org

Porteus Kiosk is a specialized edition of the Porteus operating system, a minimalist Linux distribution for web-only terminals with Firefox (or Google Chrome, Chromium or Opera, set upon installation) as the sole application. Porteus Kiosk provides users with a locked down computing environment, designed to be deployed in schools, offices, public libraries, internet cafés or any other business establishment that provides Internet access to their clients.

Porteus Kiosk can be installed to CD/DVD, USB flash drive, hard drive, or any other bootable storage media such as Compact Flash or SD/MMC memory cards. Prior to installation the system can be customized through the kiosk wizard utility which allows system and browser related tweaks.

The Porteus Kiosk system is open source and available free-of-charge, although a number of commercial services such as custom builds, automatic updates and software upgrades are available. Until version 3.7.0 Porteus Kiosk was able to run on both 32-bit (i486 or greater) and 64-bit (x86_64) machines. As Google Chrome doesn't support 32-bit machines anymore, the developers of the distribution decided to follow that path. Hence with release 4.0.0 Porteus Kiosk supports only the x86_64 architecture. The system is lightweight in terms of size and resources used. The default image is about 80 MB while the size of the custom kiosk ISO will depend on the choice of added extra components such as Adobe Flash, Java, additional fonts and other factors.

== Reception ==
In reviewing Porteus 1.0 in June 2011, Joe "Zonker" Brockmeier wrote, "Users who've missed KDE 3.5.x are in for a treat with Porteus, a portable Linux distribution that offers a 32-bit release with the Trinity fork of KDE 3.5.x, and a 64-bit release that offers KDE 4.6.4. While not a distribution that will appeal to everyone, it might be of interest to enthusiasts of live CD distributions and old-school KDE fans." He concluded "...Porteus looks like a nice portable Linux distribution, aimed at expert or at least experienced Linux users. It's not something that will appeal to the majority of Linux users, particularly users who prefer a slightly larger depth of available packages. But, for users who are nursing older hardware or prefer a portable distribution, Porteus is an interesting project."

About the custom Live CD ISO creation, Linux Magazine wrote in Issue 160/2014: "Build Your Own Portable Linux Distro with Porteus Building a customized Linux distribution can be a daunting proposition – unless you use Porteus Wizard. This clever and simple service lets you create a custom Live CD distro that fits a USB stick and loads in RAM."

== See also ==
- Lightweight Linux distribution
- List of Linux distributions that run from RAM
- List of live CDs
- Kiosk software
