= SliTaz =

Lightweight Linux distribution

SliTaz GNU/Linux

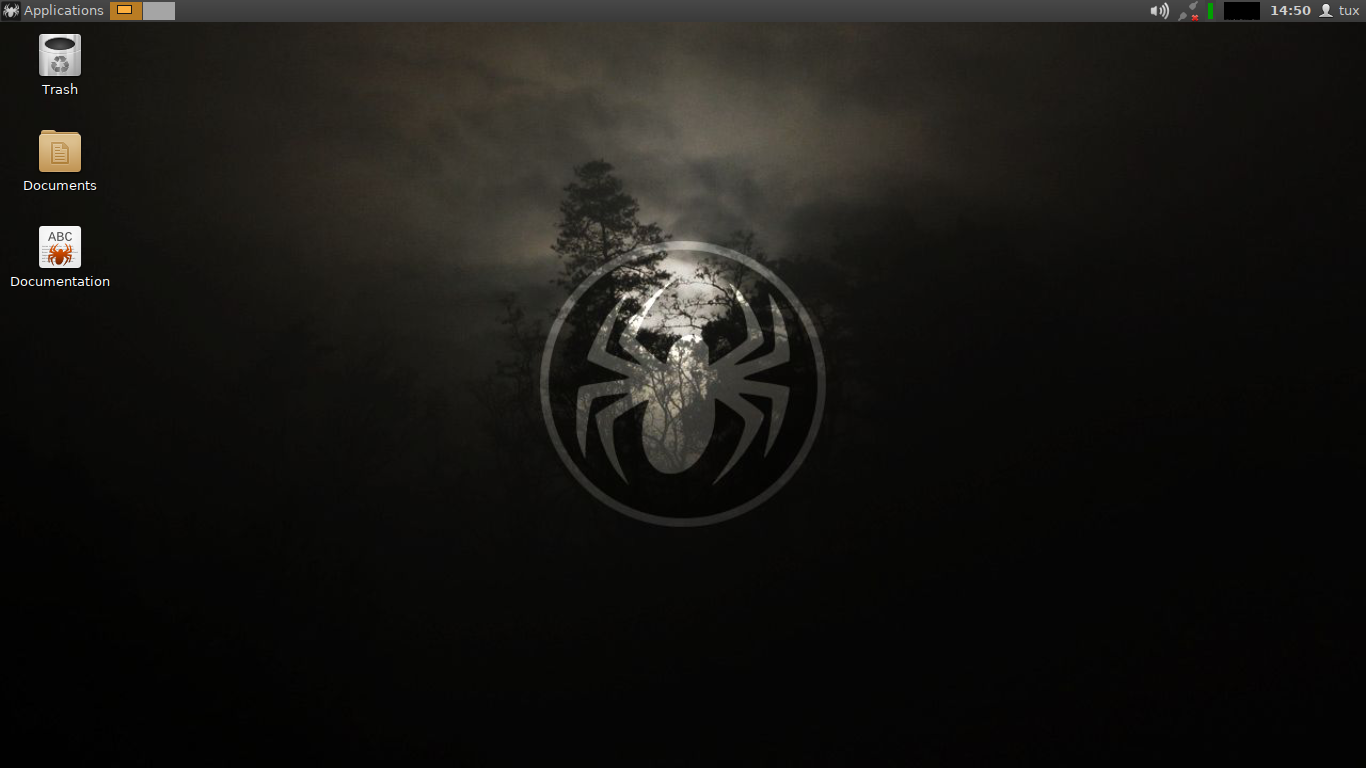
- Developer: The SliTaz GNU/Linux Association; Christophe Lincoln
- OS family: Unix-like (Linux kernel)
- Working state: Current
- Source model: Open source
- Initial release: 22 March 2008
- Latest release: 5.0 (Rolling Release) / 1 October 2023; 3 years ago
- Package manager: Tazpkg
- Supported platforms: x86 x64
- Kernel type: Monolithic (Linux kernel)
- Default user interface: Openbox
- License: GNU GPL and various others
- Official website: slitaz.org/en

SliTaz GNU/Linux is a lightweight Linux distribution, community-based, suitable for use on older hardware and as a Live CD or Live USB. SliTaz stands for "Simple, Light, Incredible, Temporary Autonomous Zone" according to the boot screen.

== Features ==
SliTaz uses the Openbox window manager.

Additional packages are added using a program called "TazPanel". This is due to the specific package format that SliTaz uses (tazpkg). It can still use packages from the more popular distributions though, as Debian, by means of first carrying out a conversion of these different packages.

By default, SliTaz offers no persistence, however it can still be added if the user wishes. The choice of the filesystem/bootloader used with SliTaz is then of importance however; persistence being only available with ext2 and ext3 filesystems and the syslinux or extlinux boot loader.

Another useful tool is TazLiTo, with which users can create their own LiveCD based on selected packages or even based upon the current system state.

== System requirements ==
SliTaz GNU/Linux is supported on all machines based on the i486 or x86 Intel compatible processors. The Live CD has four variants of SliTaz, requiring 192 MB of RAM for the Core system and 48 MB for text mode and the X Window System.

SliTaz can even run in 24 MB of RAM and a little swap memory. SliTaz can be booted from a Live CD, Live USB, floppy disk, or a local area network (PXE), or can be installed, requiring approximately 80 MB of hard disk space.

== TazLito ==
TazLito (Taz Live Tool) is the LiveCD creation utility in SliTaz GNU/Linux.

=== Common Operations ===
==== Check Root ====
Check to ensure UID is zero (i.e., TazLito was run by root or root sudoer).

==== Check Root File System ====
Looks for the existence of an etc. directory in the root file system directory. N.B., this does not do any further checking to ensure anything is actually in the directory. However, if TazLito is used for all LiveCD creation operations (that is, one does not create/modify the directories used by TazLito) the directories existence implies it is populated properly.

==== Verify Root CD ====
Looks for the existence of a boot directory in the root CD directory. N.B., this does not do any further checking to ensure anything is actually in the directory. However, if TazLito is used for all LiveCD creation operations (that is, one does not create/modify the directories used by TazLito) the directories existence implies it is populated properly.

==== Generate initramfs ====
1. Executes scripts for packages altering the root file system
2. Hard links redundant files in the root filesystem to save space
3. Runs cpio to create the initramfs, compressing with lzma or gzip (or no compression)

== Release history ==
Version	Release date	Stability
1.0	23 March 2008	Stable version
2.0	16 April 2009	Stable version
3.0	28 March 2010	Stable version
4.0	10 April 2012	Current stable version
5.0 RC1	2 May 2014	Preview version
5.0 RC2	19 May 2014	Preview version
5.0 RC3	20 May 2015	Preview version
5.0	5 November 2017	Rolling release

As with any Linux distribution, the route of development of SliTaz is mainly determined by the coders themselves. For SliTaz 5, some major changes seem to be the swapping of systemd by BusyBox's init and udev, hence avoiding safety risks, and more implementation of Qt. An implementation of x64 and ARM architectures are currently under development.

=== Recent Developments and Fork (2017–2026) ===
Beginning in 2017, the community initiated several modernization projects. Contributor Aleksej launched the "SliTaz Next" project, while, in parallel, Alanyih developed a native 64-bit version dubbed "slitaz-x86_64."

In 2021, due to technical instabilities within the official infrastructure, contributor Shann took over hosting for the project and initiated the development of "SliTaz Current" - a modernized iteration incorporating the earlier work of Alanyih and Aleksej.

In March 2026, marking the project's 20th anniversary, founder Christophe Lincoln resumed active leadership of SliTaz. This return was accompanied by disagreements regarding technical direction and governance, leading to the departure of two long-standing contributors. The official infrastructure and forum were subsequently migrated, which resulted in the deletion of various archives and posts.

Following these events, the "SliTaz Current" version officially split from the original project to become an independent fork, with the stated goal of preserving the technical developments achieved by the community and maintaining support for its users.

== Reception ==
Dedoimedo reviewed SliTaz GNU/Linux 1.0. and commented:

Badgers are known for being rather spirited and fierce for their relatively small size. Slitaz follows suit. The first thing you'll notice is a simple boot menu, written in French. Even though I don't speak French, it was rather easily to understand what the author intended. That said, I do think "neutral" distributions should go for English, as it is the most popular computer language around.

Dedoimedo also reviewed version 2.0.

DistroWatch published a review of SliTaz GNU/Linux 1.0:

Now there is a new kid on the block. SliTaz GNU/Linux 1.0 is not just another small desktop distro; it is, in fact, the smallest by some margin and just half the size of Damn Small Linux. When it runs, the 25 MB compressed CD image expands to about 80 MB, so any computer with 128 MB of RAM will be able to load it fully into memory, ensuring blazing fast program execution. Computers with less memory can boot it too; with the boot prompt cheat code of "slitaz-loram", computers with 64 MB of RAM are also supported, while those with as little as 16 MB of RAM will be able to run SliTaz as well - the cheat code is "slitaz-loram-cdrom". It goes without saying that the performance of the machine with 16 MB of RAM won't be nearly as good as that of the 128 MB one, but it's still hard to believe that there is an operating system that can run in graphical mode on machines with so little memory.

A 2022 review of SliTaz 5.0 in Full Circle magazine concluded:

SliTaz turned out to be a nice surprise in a small package. It is clear from going through the tools and menus, as well as using it, that a great deal of care has been put into this distribution, making it really look and work like a full-featured Linux distribution, all in a lightweight package suitable for older hardware

== Gallery ==
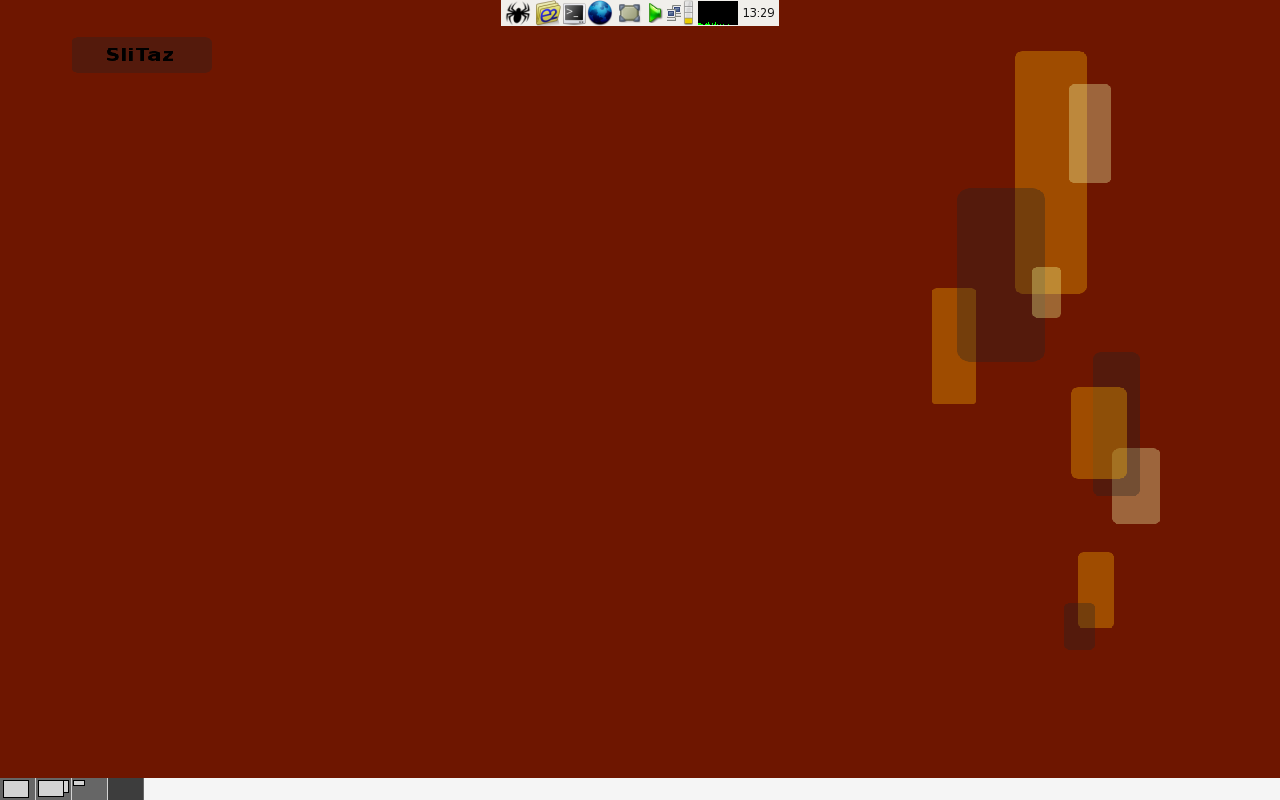
SliTaz 1.0 stable desktop

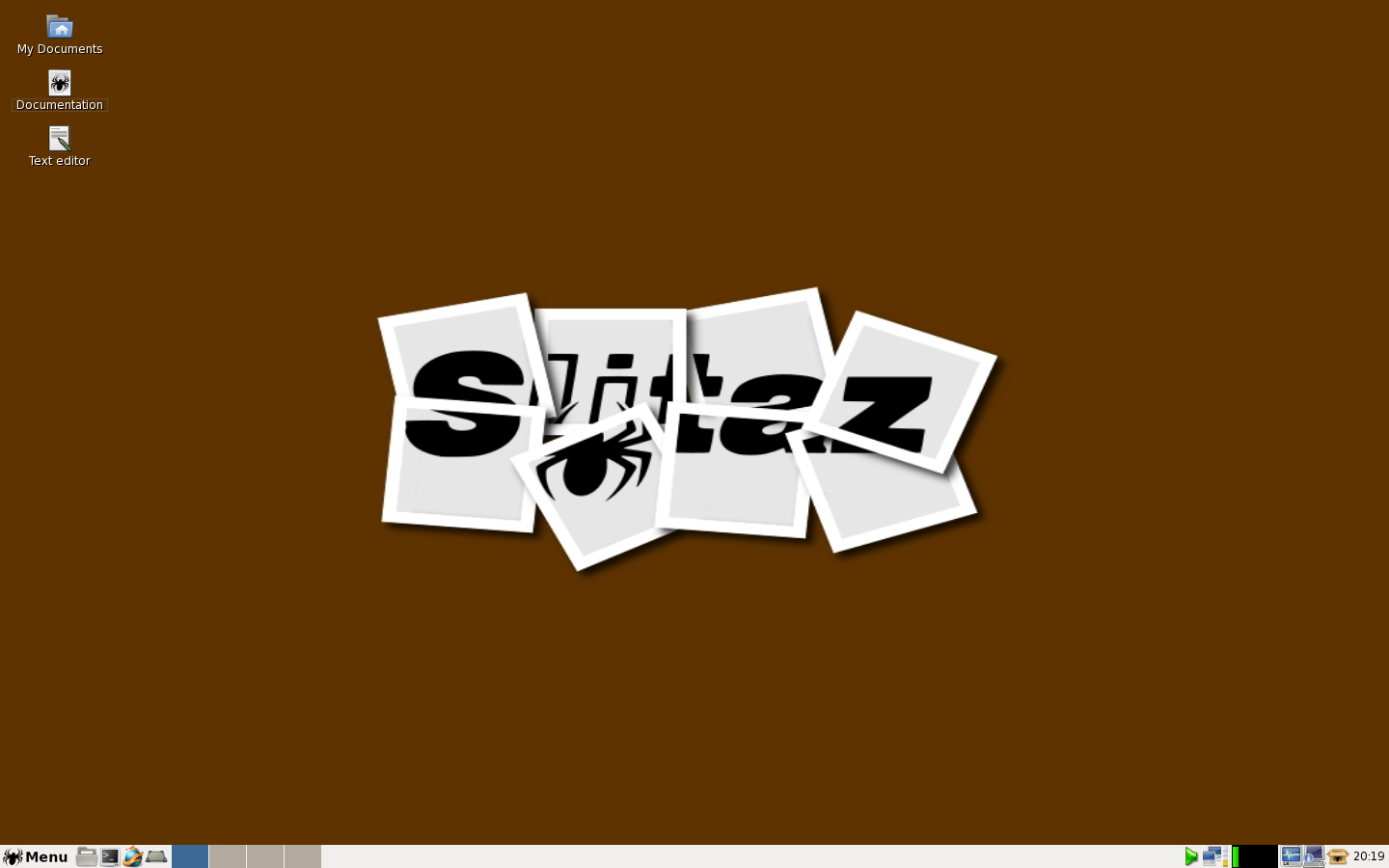
SliTaz 2.0 stable desktop

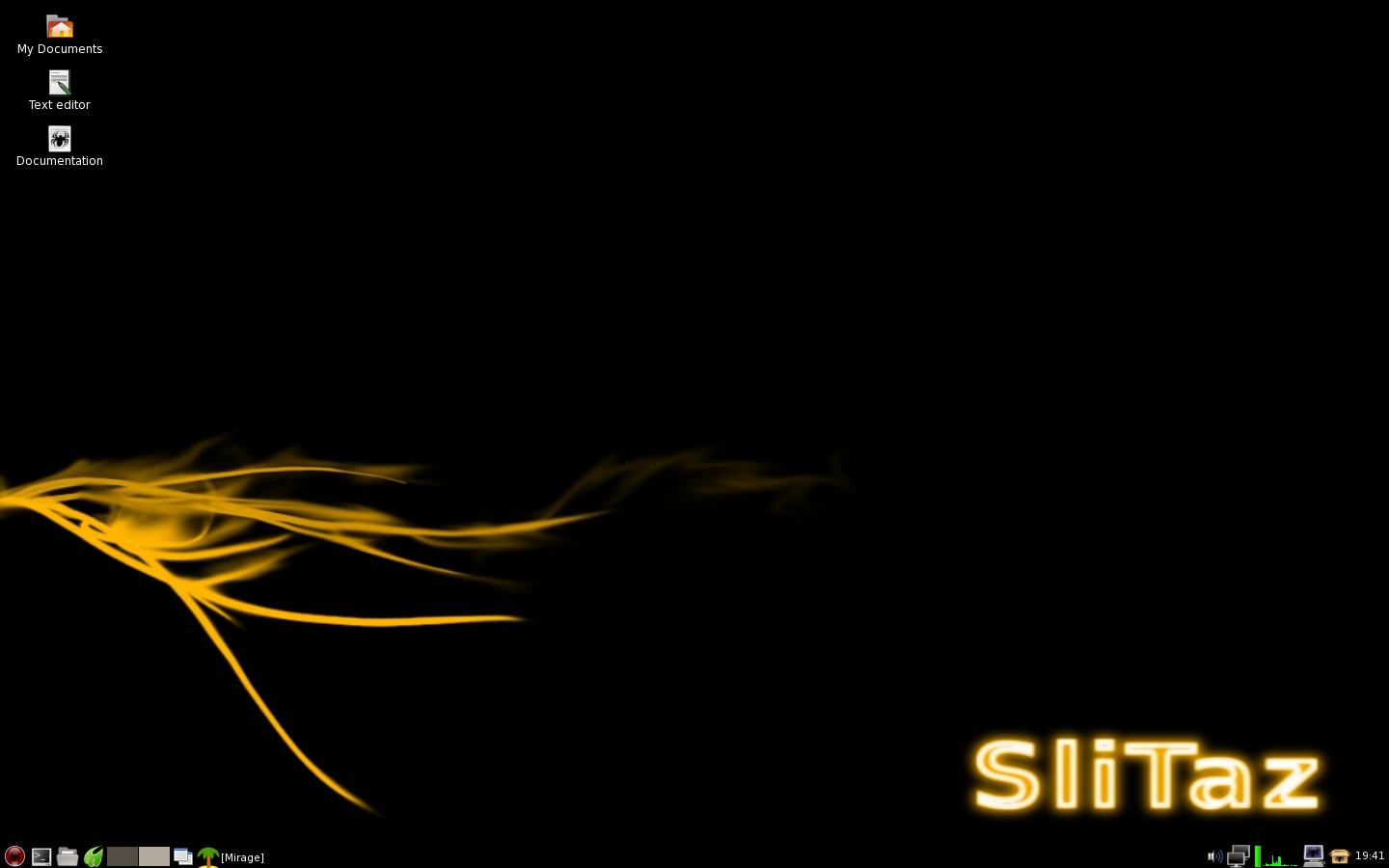
SliTaz 3.0 stable desktop

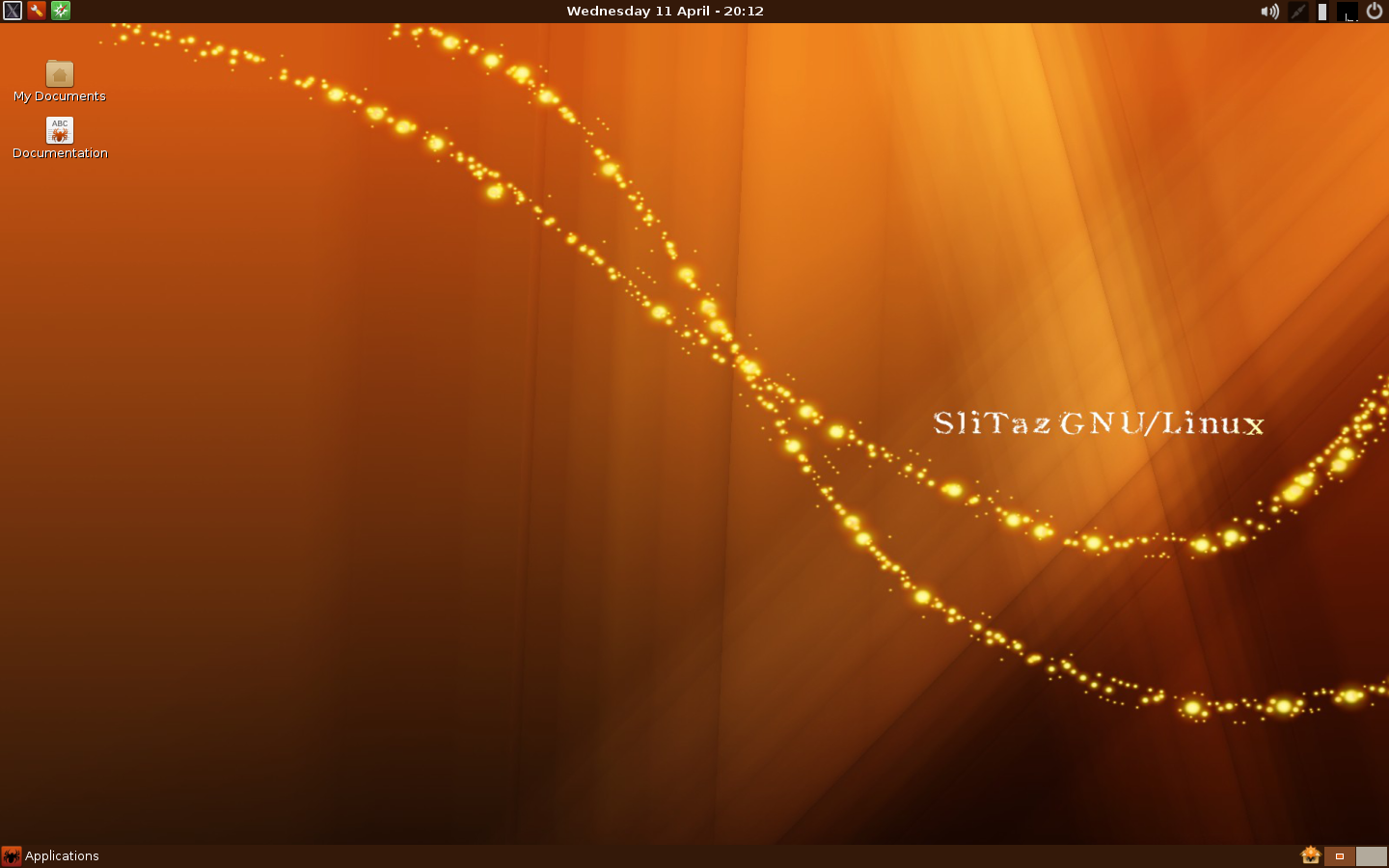
SliTaz 4.0 stable desktop

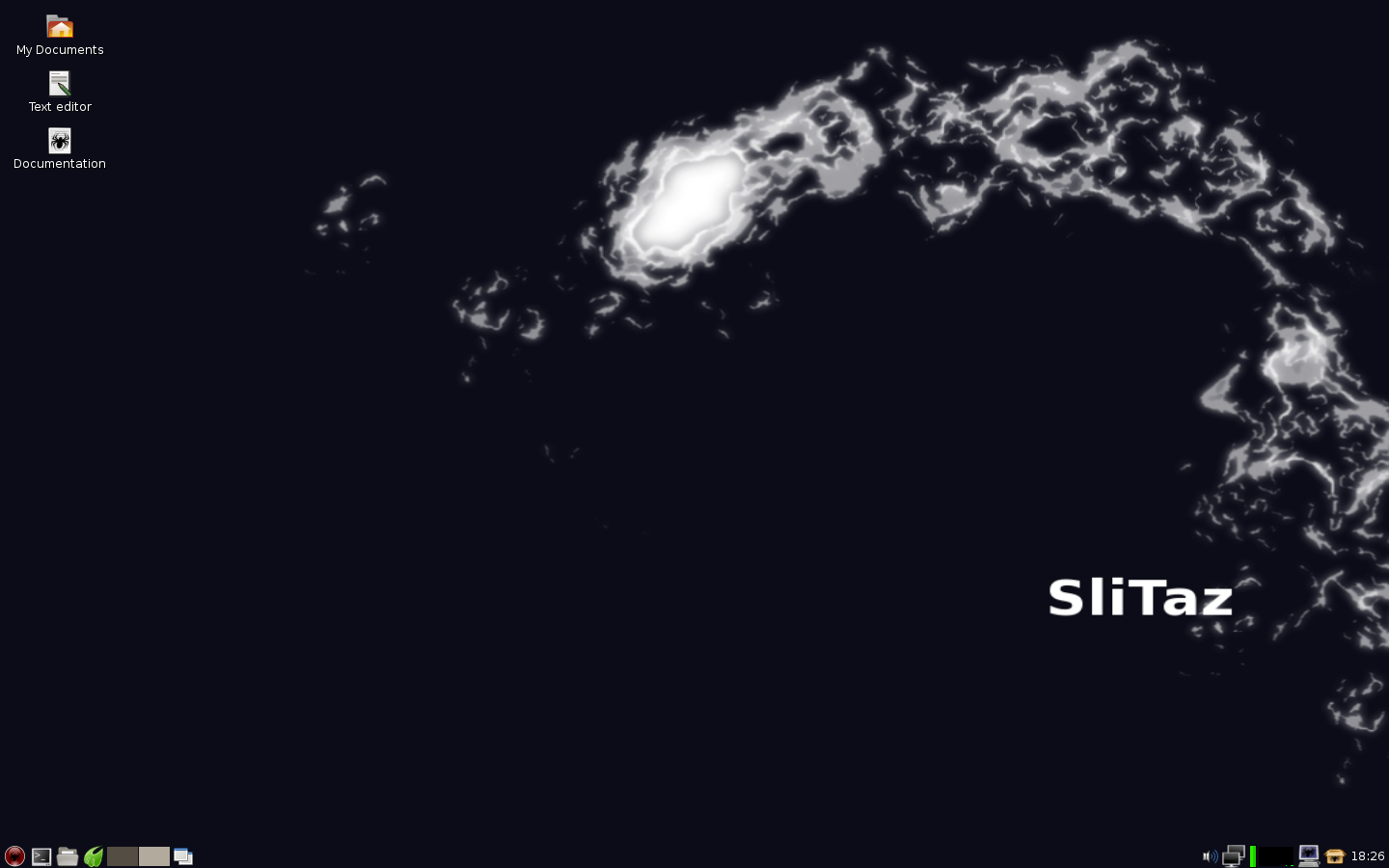
SliTaz 5.0 preview desktop

== See also ==
- Comparison of Linux Live Distros
- Lightweight Linux distribution
- List of Linux distributions that run from RAM
