= Tiny Core Linux =

Lightweight Linux distribution

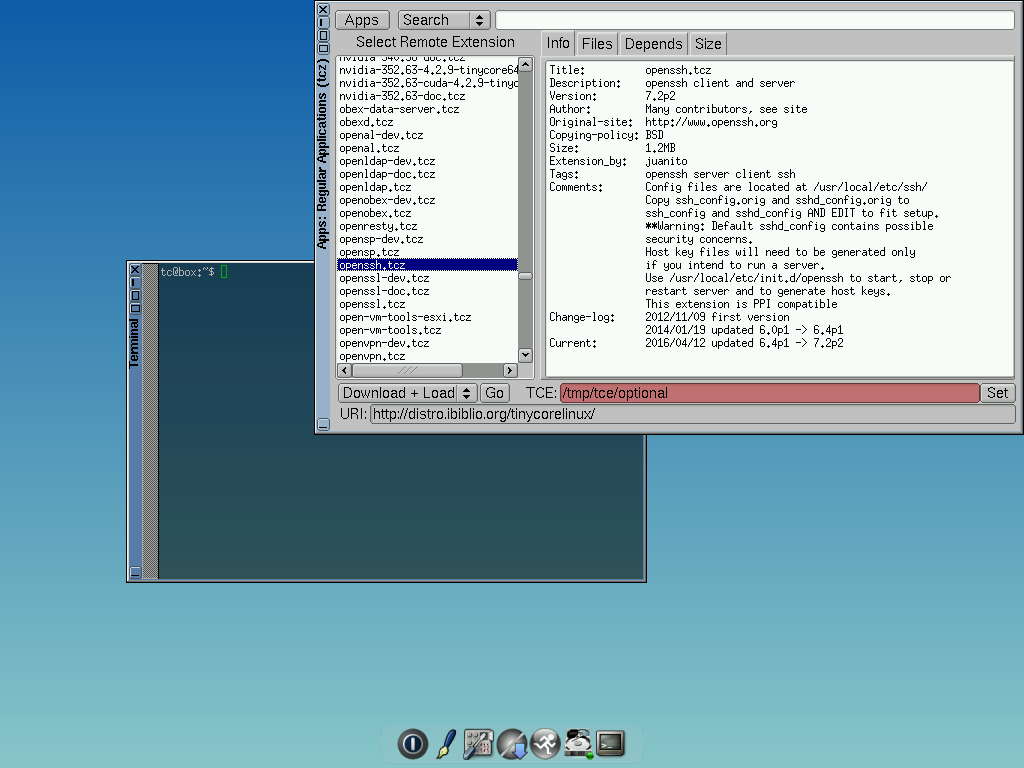
- Tiny Core Linux 7.1
- OS family: Linux (Unix-like)
- Working state: Current
- Source model: Open source
- Initial release: January 5, 2009; 17 years ago
- Latest release: 17.1 / 16 July 2026; 3 months ago
- Available in: English
- Package manager: appbrowser (GUI) / tce (CLI)
- Supported platforms: x86 x86-64 armv7 Raspberry Pi
- Kernel type: Monolithic
- Userland: BusyBox
- Default user interface: FLWM
- License: GNU GPLv2
- Official website: tinycorelinux.net

Tiny Core Linux (TCL) is a minimal Linux based operating system focusing on providing a base system using BusyBox and FLTK. It was developed by Robert Shingledecker, who was previously the lead developer of Damn Small Linux. The distribution is notable for its small size (11 to 16 MB) and minimalism; additional functions are provided by extensions. Tiny Core Linux is free and open-source software licensed under the GNU General Public License version 2.

== Types ==
- Tiny Core (23 MB) is the recommended option for new users who have a wired network connection. It includes the base Core system and a dynamic FLTK/FLWM graphical user interface.
- Core (17 MB) (also known as "Micro Core Linux") is a smaller variant of Tiny Core without a graphical desktop, though additional extensions can be added to create a system with a graphical desktop environment.
- Core64 is a port to the x86_64 architecture with a 32-bit user land, i.e. it uses a 64-bit kernel and 64-bit modules, but it can use the same extensions as Core.
- CorePure64 is a port of "Core" to the x86_64 architecture. 64-bit kernel and 64-bit extensions.
- dCore (12 MB) is a core made from Debian or Ubuntu compatible files that uses import and the SCE package format, a self-contained package format for the Tiny Core distribution since 5.x series.
- Core Plus (248 MB) is "an installation image and not the distribution". It is composed of Tiny Core with additional functionality, most notably wireless support and non-US keyboard support.
- piCore is the Raspberry Pi port of "Core".

== System requirements ==
Minimal configuration: Core requires at least 28 MB of RAM. Tiny Core needs at least 46 MB of RAM. The minimum CPU is an Intel 80486 with a math coprocessor. Required disk space is 50+ MB, plus enough extra disk space for persistent storage or added apps.

Recommended configuration: Pentium II or better CPU. Modern web browsers require a CPU with SSE2 (Pentium 4). Some additional RAM above the minimum listed above is recommended so that your applications have RAM to run in. A combined memory pool (RAM + swap) of at least 128 MB is recommended.

== Design philosophy ==
The developers describe Tiny Core as "a nomadic ultra small graphical desktop operating system capable of booting from cdrom, pendrive, or frugally from a hard drive." As of version 2.8.1, the core is designed to run primarily in RAM but with three distinct modes of operation:

- "Cloud" or Internet mode — A "testdrive" mode using a built-in appbrowser GUI to explore extensions from an online application extension repository loaded into RAM only for the current session.
- TCE/Install — A mode for Tiny Core Extensions downloaded and run from a storage partition but kept as symbolic links in RAM.
- TCE/CopyFS — A mode which installs applications onto a Linux partition like a more typical Linux installation.

== Release history ==
Version	Stability	Release date
1.0	Older version	January 5, 2009
2.0	Older version	June 7, 2009
3.0	Older version	July 19, 2010
4.0	Older version	September 25, 2011
4.7.7	Older version	May 10, 2013
5.0	Older version	September 14, 2013
5.0.1	Older version	October 1, 2013
5.0.2	Older version	October 18, 2013
5.1	Older version	November 28, 2013
5.2	Older version	January 14, 2014
5.3	Older version	April 19, 2014
5.4	Older version	September 10, 2014
6.0	Older version	January 5, 2015
6.1	Older version	March 7, 2015
6.2	Older version	May 3, 2015
6.3	Older version	May 30, 2015
6.4	Older version	September 8, 2015
6.4.1	Older version	November 4, 2015
7.0	Older version	February 23, 2016
7.1	Older version	May 22, 2016
7.2	Older version	July 4, 2016
8.0	Older version	April 10, 2017
8.1	Older version	September 3, 2017
8.2	Older version	September 22, 2017
9.0	Older version	February 26, 2018
10.0	Older version	January 20, 2019
10.1	Older version	June 11, 2019
11.0	Older version	February 9, 2020
11.1	Older version	April 1, 2020
12.0	Older version	February 17, 2021
13.0	Older version	January 31, 2022
13.1	Older version	May 8, 2022
14.0	Older version	April 12, 2023
15.0	Older version	February 22, 2024
16.0	Older version	March 31, 2025
16.1	Older version	June 16, 2025
17.0	Supported version	January 24, 2026
17.1	Latest version	July 16, 2026

== See also ==
- Comparison of Linux live distributions
- Lightweight Linux distribution
- List of Linux distributions that run from RAM
- Telikin
