= FooBillard =

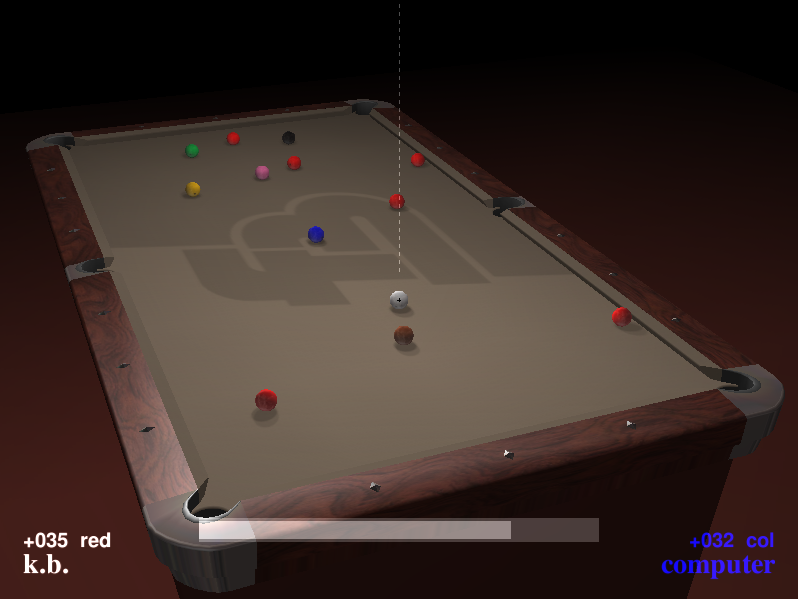
- FooBillard version 3.0a
- Developer: Florian Berger
- Platforms: AROS, BSD, Linux, Mac OS X, MorphOS, Microsoft Windows, Android
- Release: 2002
- Genre: Sports

FooBillard is a free and open-source, OpenGL-based sports simulation video game.

== Gameplay and features ==
FooBillard supports several kinds of billiard games: carom billiards (three-cushion billiards), snooker, and pool billiard (pocket billiards) in the eight-ball and nine-ball variant.

FooBillard has a realistic physics engine and a computer opponent AI. It features an optional red/green 3D stereo view (requires anaglyph 3D glasses), a free view mode and an animated cue.

== History ==
FooBillard was started around 2002 by Florian Berger. The cue sports simulator is free software, licensed under the terms of the GNU General Public License. Originally implemented for Linux it was and ported to AROS, Mac OS X, MorphOS and Windows. The most recently released version is 3.0a.

As the original FooBillard has not been under development for many years, the Foobillard++ project was created around 2011 as continuation of the game's development. Latest version of FooBillard++ 3.42 was from 2012. An Android port was created around 2014.

== Reception ==
Foobillard was reviewed in 2005 by Chip.de and noted for the "beautiful graphic" and "realistic physic". Between 2002 and 2016 the game was downloaded 1,470,000 times from SourceForge.

The game is also included in many Linux distributions, e.g. Ubuntu and OpenSUSE.
