= List of Linux distributions that run from RAM =

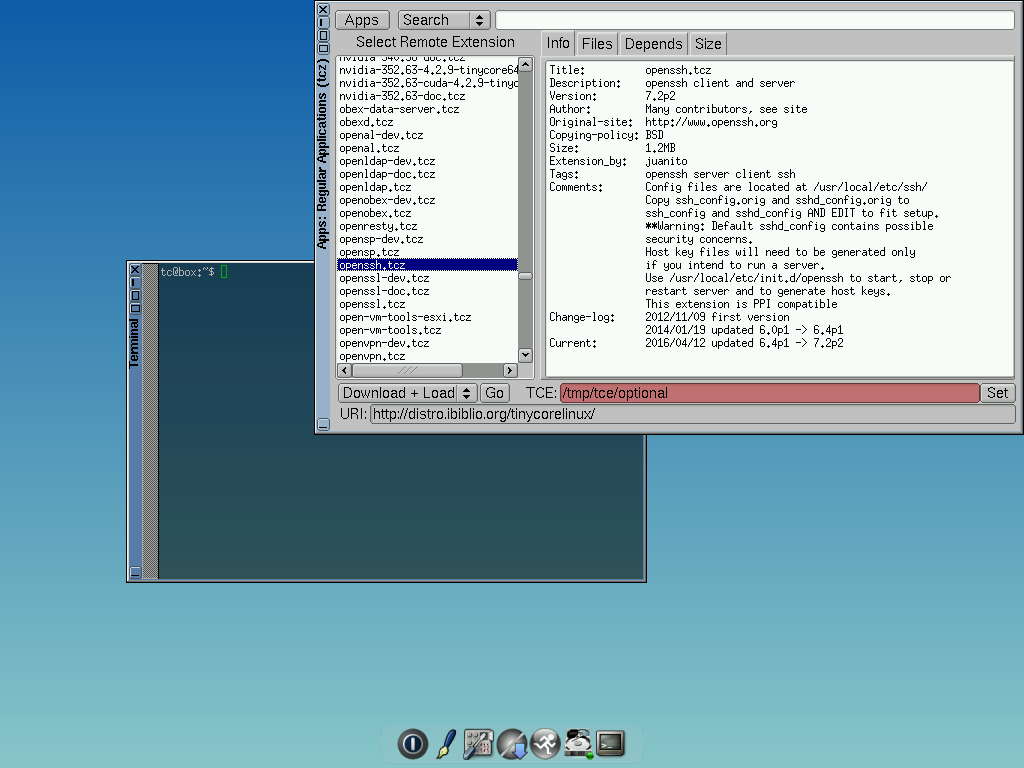
Tiny Core Linux is an example of a Linux distribution that runs from RAM.

This is a list of Linux distributions that can be run entirely from a computer's random-access memory (RAM), meaning that once the operating system (OS) has been loaded to the RAM, the media it was loaded from can be removed, and the distribution will run the personal computer (PC) from RAM only. This ability allows them to be very fast, since reading and writing data from and to RAM is far faster than on a hard disk drive or solid-state drive. Many of these operating systems will load from a removable media such as a Live CD or a Live USB stick. A "frugal" install can also often be completed, allowing loading from a hard disk drive instead.

This feature is implemented in live initial ramdisks (initramfs) and allows a user to run a live distro that does not run from RAM by default by adding toram to the kernel boot parameters.

Further, some distributions can be configured to run from RAM, such as Ubuntu, using the toram option included in the initial ramdisk Casper utility scripts.

== Table ==
Linux distributions that run from RAM
| Distribution | Based on | RAM needed | Installing drive (type needed) | Latest release |
|---|---|---|---|---|
| Alpine Linux | Independent | base system uses less than 64 MB | CD – USB flash drive – HDD | 2026-11-05; Version: 3.24.4 |
| antiX Linux | Debian | 256 MB | CD – USB flash drive – HDD | 2026-09-29; Version: 26.1 |
| Arch Linux | Independent | 400 MB | CD – DVD – USB flash drive – HDD | 2024-12-01; Version: 2024.12.01; Kernel: 6.12.1 |
| AUSTRUMI | Slackware | less than 100 MB | CD – DVD – USB flash drive | 2024-04-05; Version: 4.9.3 |
| CoreOS | Independent | 2048 MB | USB flash drive – HDD | 2020-05-22; Version: 2512.3.0 |
| Debian Live | Independent | 780 MB (required), 2048 MB (recommended) | DVD – USB flash drive – HDD – Secure Digital | 2025-05-17; Version: 12.11; Kernel: 6.1 |
| Grml | Debian | 256 MB (required), 512 MB (or more, recommended) | CD – USB flash drive – HDD | 2025-05-15; Version: 2025.05; Kernel: 6.14.4 |
| Kanotix | Debian & Knoppix | 1024 MB | CD – DVD – USB flash drive – HDD | 2024-04-01; Version: Slowfire 2024; Kernel: 6.6.13 |
| Knoppix | Debian | 1024 MB | CD – DVD – USB flash drive – HDD | 2022-05-05; Version: 9.3 |
| Lightweight Portable Security (LPS), currently known as Trusted End Node Security (TENS) | Thinstation | 1024 MB (basic), 1.5 GB (deluxe) | CD – USB flash drive | 2021-04-30; Version: 3.0.4.1 |
| Lightwhale | Independent | 400 MB | CD – DVD – USB flash drive – HDD | 2026-05-01; Version: 3.0.1; Kernel: 6.19.5 |
| Nanolinux | Tiny Core Linux | 64 MB | CD – DVD – USB flash drive – HDD | 2015-04-05; Version: 1.3 |
| Parted Magic | Independent | 175 MB – 312 MB | CD – DVD – USB flash drive – HDD | 2025-01-22; Version: 2025_01_22 |
| PCLinuxOS | Mandriva | 1024 MB | CD – DVD – USB flash drive – HDD | 2024-10-17; Version: 2024.10; Kernel: 6.10.10 |
| Porteus | Slackware | 512 MB | CD – DVD – USB flash drive | 2023-09-26; Version: 5.01; Kernel: 6.5 |
| Puppy Linux | Independent | 64 MB (required), 512 MB (recommended) | CD – DVD – USB flash drive – HDD | 2025-02-13; Version: BookwormPup64 10.0.10 |
| Slax | Debian and Slackware 15.0.0 | 512 MB | CD – DVD – USB flash drive – HDD | 2023-10-10; Version: 12.2.0 |
| SliTaz | Independent | 192 MB (48 MB for base) | CD – DVD – USB flash drive – HDD – Floppy disk | 2023-10-01; Version: 5.0; Kernel: 3.2.53 |
| Tails | Debian | 2048 MB (recommended) | DVD – USB flash drive – HDD – Secure Digital | 2026-08-19; Version: 7.11 |
| Tin Hat Linux | Hardened Gentoo | 4096 MB | | 2002-02-01; Version: 1.0 |
| Tiny SliTaz | SliTaz | 4 MB | CD – USB flash drive – HDD – Floppy disk | 2025-04-06 |
| Tiny Core Linux | Independent | 46 MB | CD – HDD – USB flash drive | 2025-03-31; Version: 16.0; Kernel: 6.12.11 |

== See also ==
- tmpfs; by mounting a tmpfs and running files that are placed on this, files and programs can be run from RAM, even on Linux distros that do not run completely in RAM
- Clustered file system; network file systems are another way to avoid needing to use a (slow) hard disk
- initrd ("initial ramdisk"), a scheme for loading a temporary root file system into memory in the boot process of the Linux kernel
- Light-weight Linux distribution
- List of live CDs
- List of tools to create bootable USB
- SYSLINUX, a suite of lightweight PC MBR bootloaders for starting up computers with the Linux kernel
- Windows PE, a non-Linux operating system that can also be run from RAM, but does not have all of the needed software
- Just enough operating system
