= IceWM =

X11 window manager

- Developer: Marko Maček
- Release: 1997; 29 years ago
- Stable release: 4.1.0 / 6 August 2026; 3 months ago
- Written in: C++
- Operating system: Unix-like
- Type: Window manager
- License: 1998: LGPL-2.0-only (Note: LGPL-2.0-only since 1998, version 0.9.13.); 1997: GPL-2.0-only (Note: GPL-2.0-only from 1997-07-14 until 1998, version 0.9.12.)
- Website: ice-wm.org
- Repository: github.com/ice-wm/icewm

IceWM is a stacking window manager for the X Window System, originally written by Marko Maček. It was written from scratch in C++ and is released under the terms of the GNU Lesser General Public License. It is customizable, relatively lightweight in terms of memory and CPU usage, and comes with themes that allow it to imitate the GUI of Windows 95, Windows XP, Windows 7, OS/2, Motif, and other graphical user interfaces.

IceWM can be configured from plain text files stored in a user's home directory, making it easy to customize and copy settings. IceWM has an optional, built-in taskbar with a dynamic start menu, tasks display, system tray, network and CPU meters, mail check and configurable clock. It features a task list window and an Alt+Tab task switcher. Official support for GNOME and KDE menus used to be available as a separate package. In recent IceWM versions, support for them is built-in as well. External graphical programs for editing the configuration and the menu are also available.

== Usage ==
IceWM is installed as the default window manager for Absolute Linux, AntiX and Legacy OS.

The Easy mode default desktop of the Asus Eee PC uses IceWM.

openSUSE for Raspberry Pi uses IceWM by default as a lightweight GUI. The Raspberry Pi 3 only version of SUSE Linux Enterprise Server also uses IceWM.

== Screenshots ==
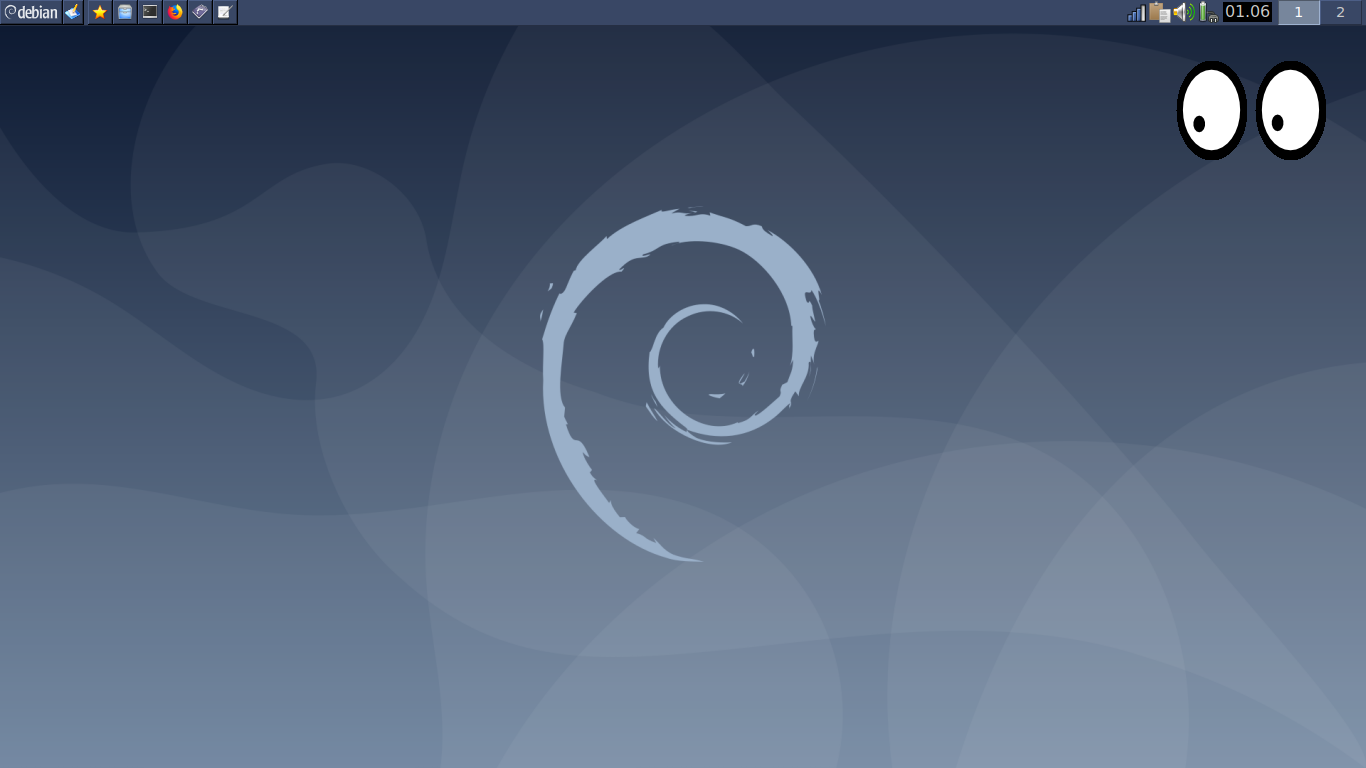
IceWM with Xeyes on Debian Buster

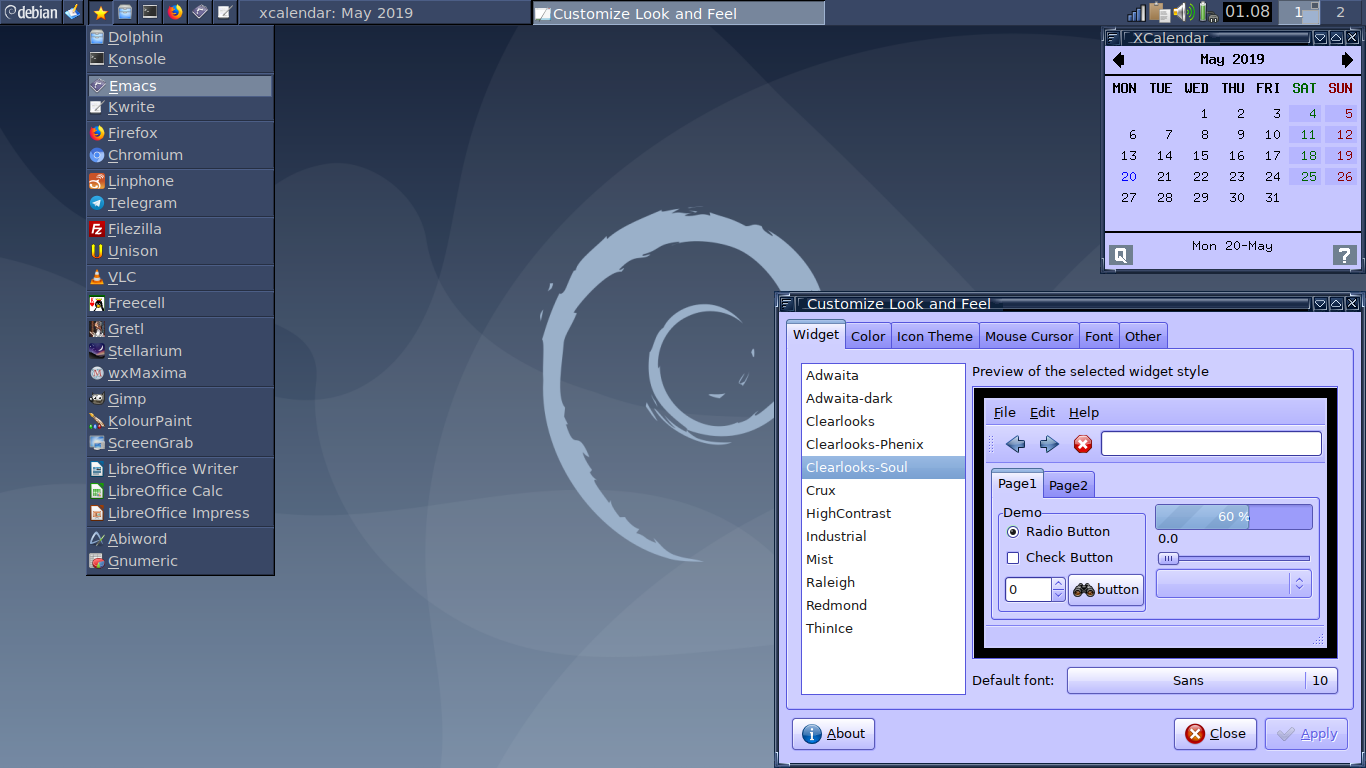
IceWM in action

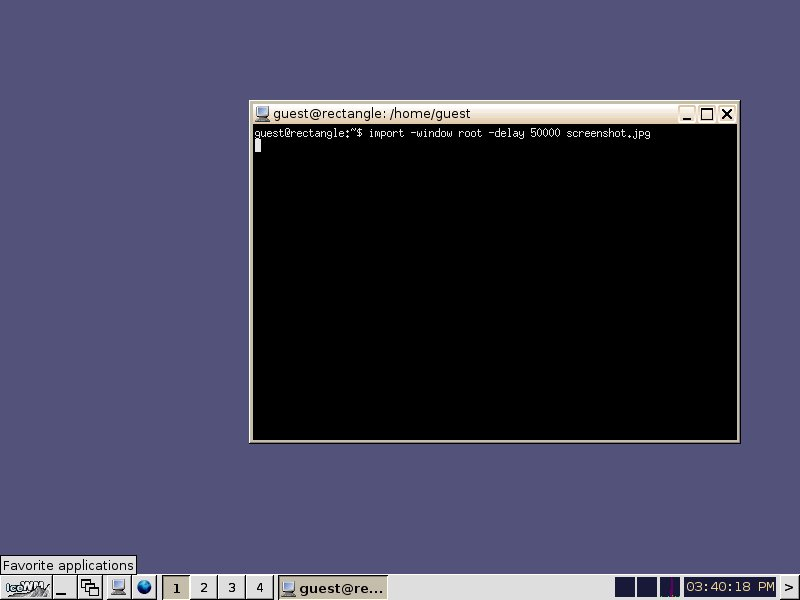
IceWM, featuring the IceDesert theme

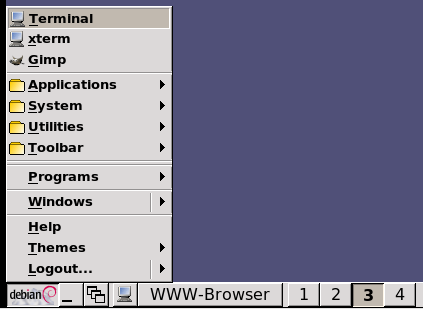
IceWM's Start Menu is intended to resemble that of Windows 95.

IceWM 1.3 Xsession running on Debian 7 Linux

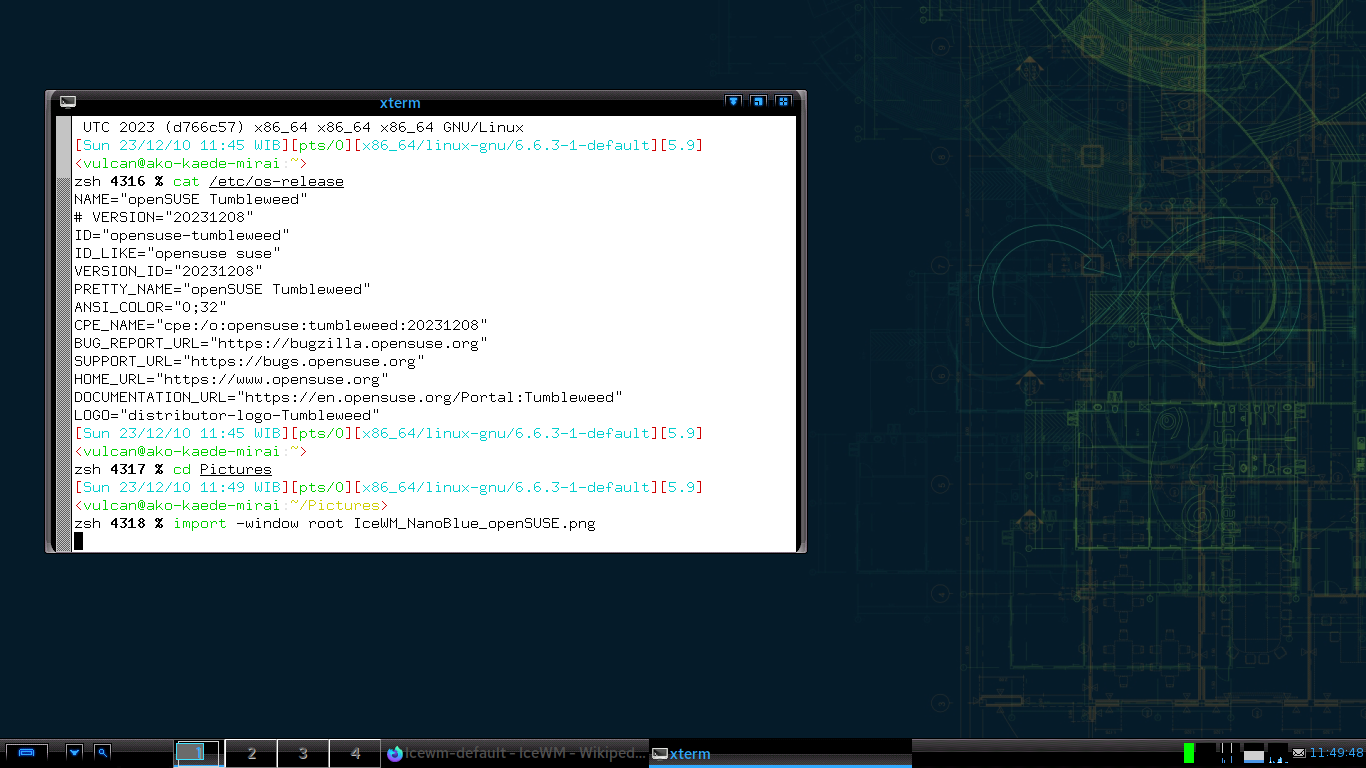
IceWM, featuring the NanoBlue theme on openSUSE

IceWM running on AntiX 23.1

== See also ==
- FVWM95
- Comparison of X window managers
- Spri, a former lightweight Linux distribution which used IceWM as its default user interface
