= CrunchBang Linux =

Debian-based Linux distribution

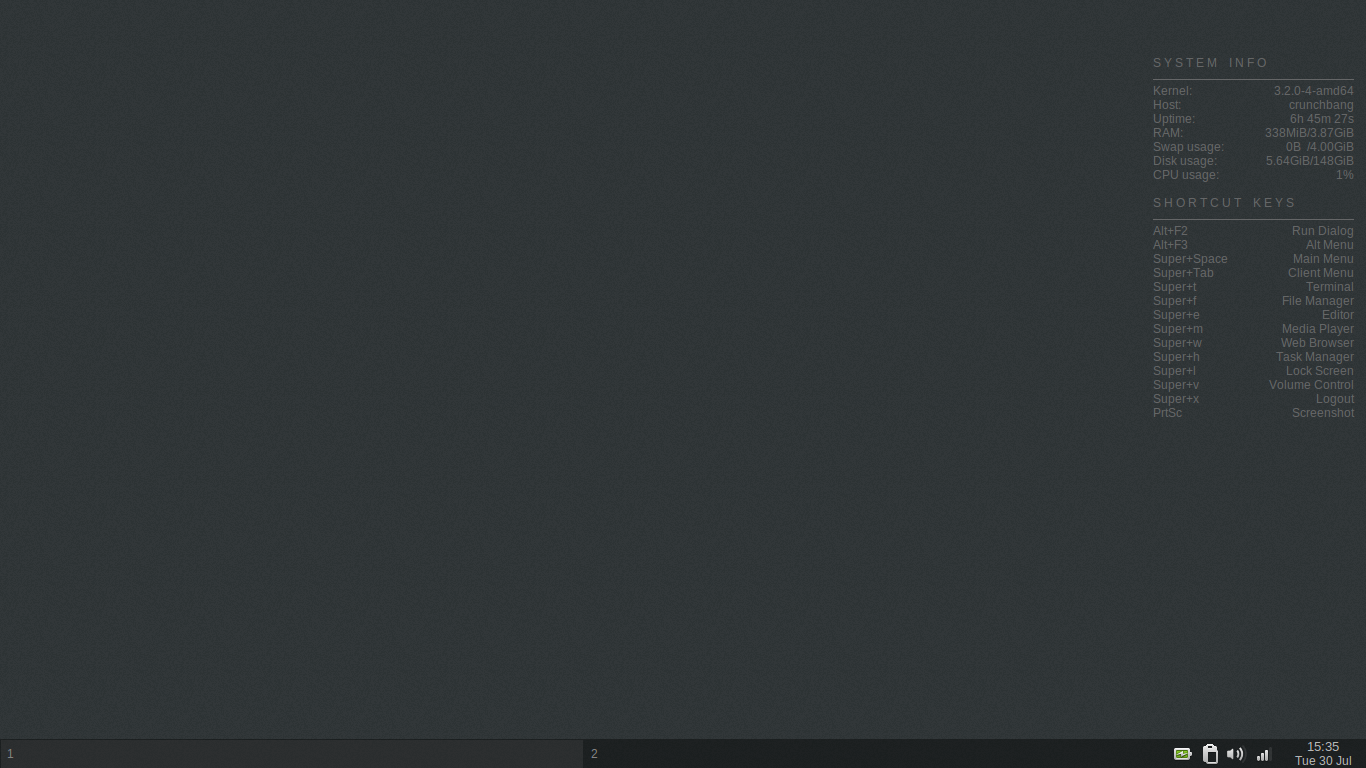
- CrunchBang Linux 11 Waldorf
- OS family: Linux (Unix-like)
- Working state: Discontinued
- Source model: Open source with proprietary components
- Latest release: 11 (Waldorf) / 6 May 2013; 13 years ago
- Update method: APT
- Package manager: dpkg, with several front-ends
- Kernel type: Linux
- Default user interface: Openbox
- Official website: crunchbang.org

CrunchBang Linux (abbreviated #!) is an unmaintained Linux distribution derived from Debian by Philip Newborough (who is more commonly known by his username, corenominal).

CrunchBang was designed to use comparatively few system resources. Instead of a desktop environment it used a customized implementation of the Openbox window manager. Many of its preinstalled applications used the GTK+ widget toolkit.

CrunchBang had its own software repository but drew the vast majority of packages from Debian's repositories.

Philip Newborough announced on 6 February 2015 that he had stopped developing CrunchBang and that users would benefit from using vanilla Debian. Some Linux distributions have arisen in its place in an effort to continue its environment. Among the most significant are BunsenLabs and CrunchBang++.

== Editions ==
CrunchBang Linux provided an Openbox version for i686, i486 and amd64 architectures. Until October 2010 there also was a "Lite" version with fewer installed applications. The "Lite" version was effectively discontinued after the distribution on which it was based – Ubuntu 9.04 – reached its end-of-life and CrunchBang prepared to switch to a different base system.

CrunchBang 10, made available in February 2011, was the first version based on Debian. The final version, CrunchBang 11, was made available on 6 May 2013.

Each CrunchBang Linux release was given a version number as well as a code name, using names of Muppet Show characters. The first letter of the code name was the first letter of the upstream Debian release (previously Debian Squeeze and CrunchBang Statler and currently Debian Wheezy and CrunchBang Waldorf).

== Reception ==
In May 2013 Jim Lynch of desktoplinuxreviews.com reviewed CrunchBang 11:

Frankly, it’s one of the most functional and efficient distros available today. You can run it on top of the line hardware, or you can run it on older, slower machines. It’s a perfect choice for anyone who prefers functionality over form....These days it seems that lots of distros and other operating systems are adding tons of glitz and glitter to desktop interfaces. CrunchBang 11 does the complete opposite. Frankly, it’s a breath of fresh air and I enjoyed it. It was fast, stable and did what I wanted it to do. It never bogged me down in useless desktop drivel.

== Successors ==
Newborough announced in February 2015 that he was abandoning further development of CrunchBang Linux, feeling that it no longer served a purpose. Many users disagreed, and a number of them proceeded to develop successor distributions BunsenLabs, CrunchBang++ (#!++) and CrunchBang-Monara.

=== BunsenLabs ===
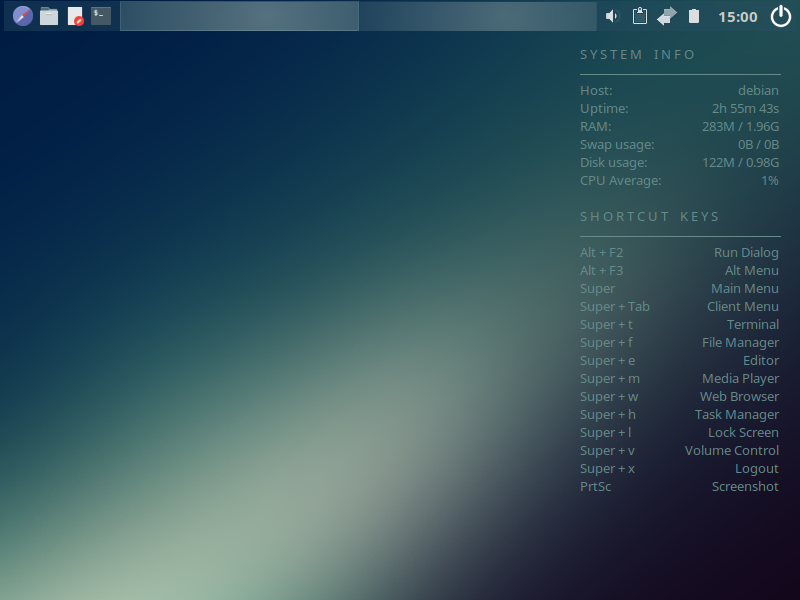
BunsenLabs Helium R4 cdsized

BunsenLabs Linux is a community-organized successor to CrunchBang. It was originally based on the Debian 10 (Buster) stable release. Between the 17th and 30th of September 2015, CrunchBang's domain began redirecting to BunsenLabs.

BunsenLabs is one of the few modern Debian-based live distributions that still offers a CD edition supporting 32-bit systems, with both the X Window System and a modern version of Firefox, making the distro useful for running on old computers with just around 1 GB of RAM.

The latest version BunsenLabs "Carbon", based on Debian 13, was released on 11 February 2026.

=== CrunchBang++ ===
CrunchBang PlusPlus (#!++) was developed in response to Newborough's announcement of the end of CrunchBang. It is currently based on the Debian Trixie (release 13) distribution. Release 1.0 was announced on 29 April 2015. A version based on Debian 10.0 was released on 8 July 2019. The version based on Debian 11.0 was released on 16 August 2021, version based on Debian 11.1 was released on 23 September 2021. The version based on Debian 12.0 was released on 11 June 2023. The latest version based on Debian 13.0 was released on 19 August 2025.
