= Finnix =

Linux distribution

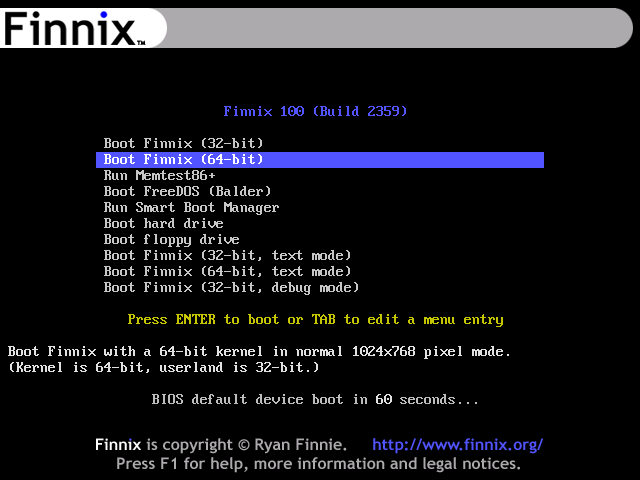
- Finnix 100 boot screen
- Developer: Ryan Finnie
- OS family: Linux (Unix-like)
- Working state: Current
- Source model: Open source
- Initial release: March 22, 2000; 25 years ago
- Latest release: 251 / 17 November 2025; 56 days ago
- Marketing target: System administrators
- Available in: English
- Update method: APT
- Package manager: dpkg
- Supported platforms: x86-64
- Kernel type: Monolithic (Linux)
- Default user interface: Console
- License: Various
- Official website: www.finnix.org

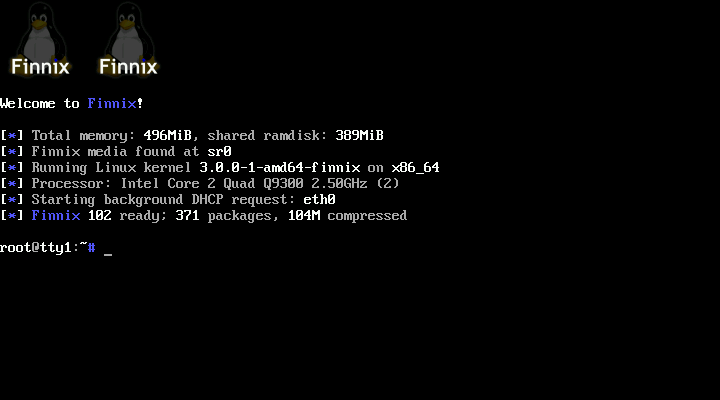
Finnix 102 default startup on an x86_64 system

Finnix is a Debian-based Live CD operating system, developed by Ryan Finnie and intended for system administrators for tasks such as filesystem recovery, network monitoring and OS installation. Finnix is a relatively small distribution, with an ISO download size of approximately 500 MiB, and is available for the X86-64 architecture. Finnix can be run off a bootable CD, a USB flash drive, a hard drive, or network boot (PXE).

== History ==
Finnix development first began in 1999, making it one of the oldest Linux distributions released with the intent of being run completely from a bootable CD (the other Live CD around at the time was the Linuxcare Bootable Business Card CD, first released in 1999). Finnix 0.01 was based on Red Hat Linux 6.0, and was created to help with administration and recovery of other Linux workstations around Finnie's office. The first public release of Finnix was 0.03, and was released in early 2000, based on an updated Red Hat Linux 6.1. Despite its 300 MiB ISO size and requirement of 32 MiB RAM (which, given RAM prices and lack of high-speed Internet proliferation at the time, was prohibitive for many), Finnix enjoyed moderate success, with over 10,000 downloads. After version 0.03, development ceased, and Finnix was left unmaintained until 2005.

On 23 October 2005, Finnix 86.0 was released. Earlier unreleased versions (84, and 85.0 through 85.3) were "Knoppix remasters", with support for Linux LVM and dm-crypt being the main reason for creation. However, 86.0 was a departure from Knoppix, and was derived directly from the Debian "testing" tree.

== Usage ==
Finnix is released as a small bootable CD ISO. A user can download the ISO, burn the image to CD, and boot into a text mode Linux environment. Finnix requires at least 32 MiB RAM to run properly, but can use more if present. Most hardware devices are detected and dealt with automatically, such as hard drives, network cards and USB devices. A user can modify files nearly anywhere on the running CD via a union mount filesystem (UnionFS or AUFS, depending on the Finnix release), stacking a read-write filesystem (in this case, a dynamic ramdisk) on top of a read-only filesystem (the CD media). Any changes made during the Finnix session are transparently written to RAM and discarded upon shutdown. In addition, Finnix uses SquashFS to keep distribution size low.

Finnix can be run completely within RAM, provided the system has at least 192 MiB RAM available. If a "toram" option is passed to Finnix, most of the contents of the CD are copied to a RAM disk, and the CD is ejected, freeing the CD-ROM drive for other purposes. Finnix can also be placed on a bootable USB thumb drive, or installed permanently on a hard drive (though still functioning as if it were a LiveCD).

== Versions ==
New versions of Finnix are released every 3 months on average, with updated software from the Debian "testing" tree, along with new Finnix-specific functionality. Versions 86.0 through 93.0 used a major/minor versioning scheme, with major releases usually including major functionality changes, and minor releases including minor fixes and Debian updates to bring Finnix's packages up to date with Debian's "testing" tree. Beginning with version 100, releases are numbered as a simple incrementing integer. Development builds are named after cities and towns in Wisconsin.
