= BioSLAX =

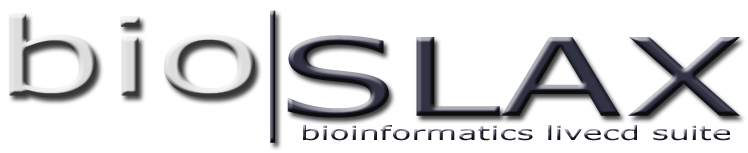

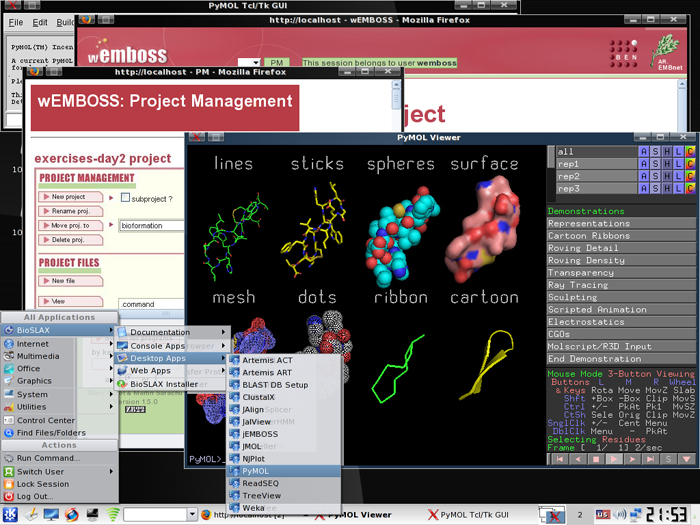
- Various bio applications running on BioSLAX
- Developer: National University of Singapore; BioInformatics Center (Resource); Mark De Silva; Lim Kuan Siong; Tan Tin Wee
- OS family: Unix-like: Linux
- Working state: Current
- Source model: Open source
- Latest release: v 7.5 / February 5, 2009; 17 years ago
- Supported platforms: IA-32, x86-64
- Kernel type: Monolithic
- License: Various
- Official website: www.bioslax.com

BioSLAX is a Live CD, Live DVD, and Live USB operating system (OS) comprising a suite of more than 300 bioinformatics tools and application suites. It has been released by the Bioinformatics Resource Unit of the Life Sciences Institute (LSI), National University of Singapore (NUS) and is bootable from any PC that allows a CD/DVD or Universal Serial Bus (USB) boot option and runs the compressed Slackware flavour of the Linux OS, also known as Slax. Slax was created by Tomáš Matějíček in the Czech Republic using the Linux Live Scripts which he also developed. The BioSLAX derivative was created by Mark De Silva, Lim Kuan Siong, and Tan Tin Wee.

BioSLAX was first released to the NUS Life Science Curriculum in April 2006.

== History ==
In January 2003, APBioNet received a research grant from the Pan Asia Networking (PAN) Programme of IDRC (Canada) to build an APBioBox of commonly used bioinformatics applications and packages with grid-computing software as part of its effort to build an APBioGrid. The platform chosen was the then ubiquitous Redhat Linux. In March of that same year, APBioNet launched an industry partnership scheme (AIPS) and partnered with Sun Microsystems to build BioBox for the Solaris platform. Six months later, beta versions of APBioBox and Sun's biobox, now named Bio-Cluster Grid were released for beta testing among selected parties. The packages included Globus Grid Toolkit Version 2.0 and Sun Grid Engine respectively.

On 4 December 2003, the biobox software packages then named APBioBox (Redhat Linux) and BioCluster Grid (Sun Solaris) were field-tested at a Bioinformatics Workshop was conducted at the Advanced Science and Technology Institute (ASTI), Department of Science and Technology (DOST), Philippines on the occasion of the 70th Anniversary of the National Research Council of the Philippines (NRCP). Ten pentium machines and a couple of Sun servers were successfully inducted into the APBioGrid. This Workshop and the software tested were sponsored by Sun Microsystems and partly funded by IDRC.

In July 2004, Dr. Derek Kiong introduced Knoppix as a stable, powerful and small Unix (Debian-based) platform to A/Prof Tan Tin Wee in a workshop organised by the Institute of Systems Science (ISS), NUS. By September 2004, through Mr. Ong Guan Sin, they were able to create a Knoppix remaster template by building software in APBioBox plus useful applications into a prototype, APBioKnoppix, as a project for the practical course of LSM2104 module of the Department of Biochemistry, NUS. It was later upgraded based on Knoppix 4.02 and released as APBioKnoppix2. While APBioKnoppix was widely used, it was found that it was not easily expandable. All applications had to be in place before remastering, which made the distribution very inflexible.

In June 2005, Mr. Mark De Silva of the Bioinformatics Resource Unit of the Life Sciences Institute (LSI), suggested using Slax as a base for a new bio-based live CD due to its modular system, which effectively allowed for the same base system to be used and various tools or changes to be included on top of the base easily by adding single modules with all application files or changes. This eliminated the need to remaster the entire system every time new software or changes emerged, which was the case for Knoppix.

By April 2006, the first version of BioSLAX was released with several editions:

- Standard User Edition (530 MB)
- Developer Edition (700 MB)
- Server Edition (470 MB)

BioSLAX was subsequently used in the bioinformatics teaching module within NUS under the Life Science Curriculum as well as in several events that were organized under the umbrella of the Asia Pacific Bioinformatics Network (APBioNet). APBioNet is a regional affiliate of the International Society for Computational Biology (ISCB). Customized versions were built to cater for both NUS and APBioNet.

In August 2007, in collaboration with the APBioNet, a customized BioSLAX was used to set up the Bioinformatics Resource Node of Vietnam at Bio-IBT, the Bioinformatics Resource Server of the Institute of Biotechnology, Vietnam Academy of Science and Technology, Hanoi, Viet Nam. The Bio-IBT node offered:

- BioMirrors repository of biological databases
- NCBI BLAST mirrored resource
- Web access to EBI EMBOSS applications
- Web access to ClustalW multiple sequence alignment
- Web access to the T-Coffee multiple sequence alignment
- Web access to the PHYLIP Phylogenetic Inference Package
- Web access to the Sequence Manipulation Suite, SMS2

Users with SSH access to the server also had access to many more command-line interface based bio/life science applications.

The entire project was done in collaboration with the 1st UNESCO-IUBMB-FAOBMB-APBioNet Bioinformatics Workshop in Vietnam, held 20–31 August 2007, a satellite event of the 6th International Conference on Bioinformatics (InCoB) 2007 at HongKong, Hanoi, and Nansha.

Some versions of BioSLAX deployed in international institutions under APBioNet were fitted with a small tool which allowed them to map their IPs to a dynamically created apbionet.org domain name, hence giving each machine a fully qualified domain name (FQDN) and presence on the Internet.

== Modularity ==
Because Slax worked by overlaying "application modules" on top of the base Linux OS, it made the entire distribution modular. The additional functionality of deploying these modules even while the system was already running, made using Slax even more appealing. The inclusion of the graphical user interface (GUI) based "BioSLAX Module Manager", streamlined this process of dynamically adding and removing modules.

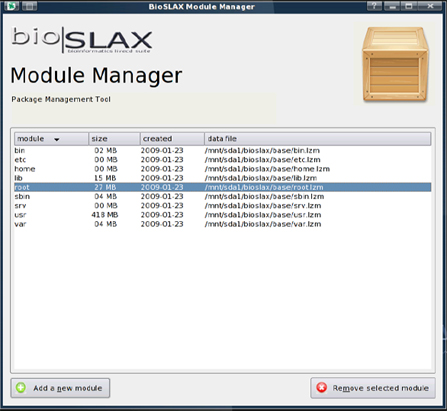
Users were able to test updates to software or new versions and "rollback" to prior versions as needed. This was especially effective if SLAX/BioSLAX was installed to a writable medium such as a USB drive.

== Versions ==
Screenshots
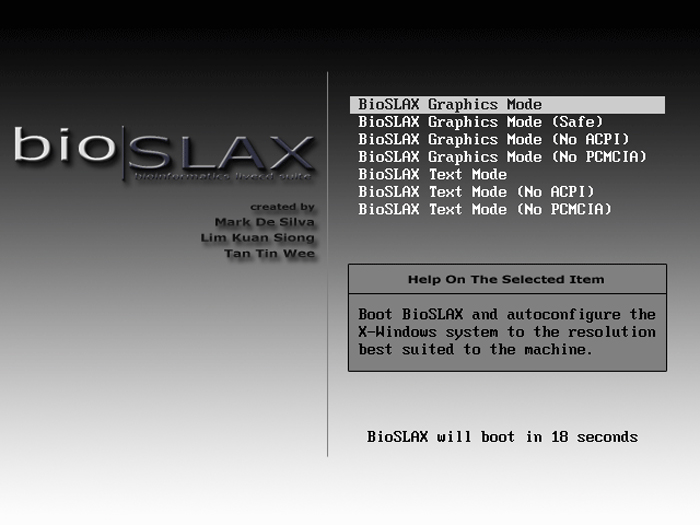
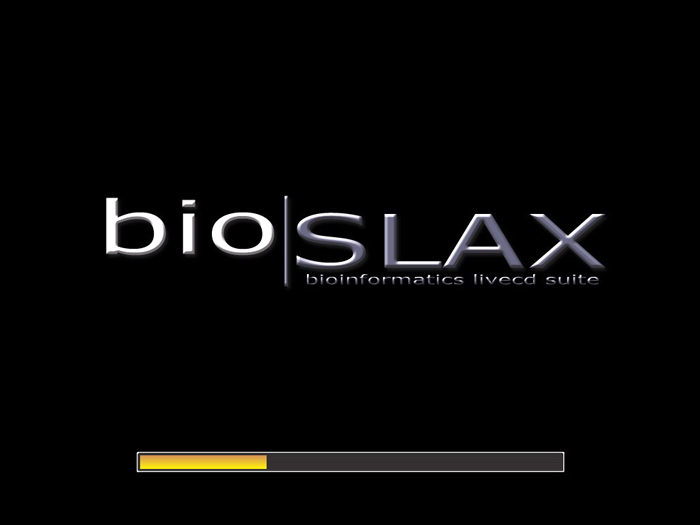
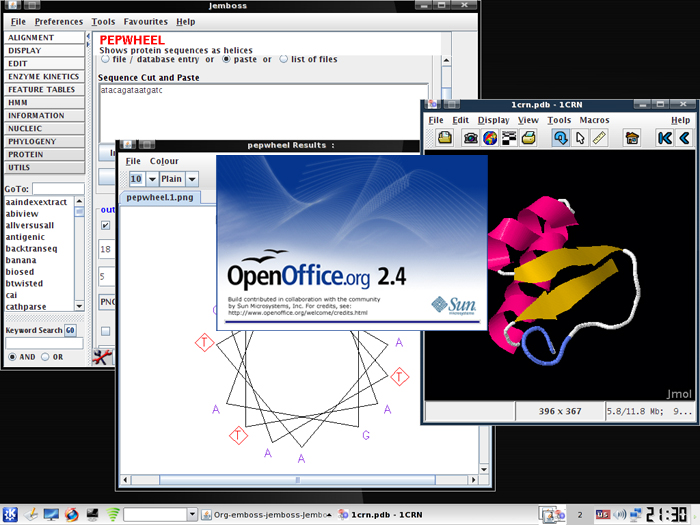
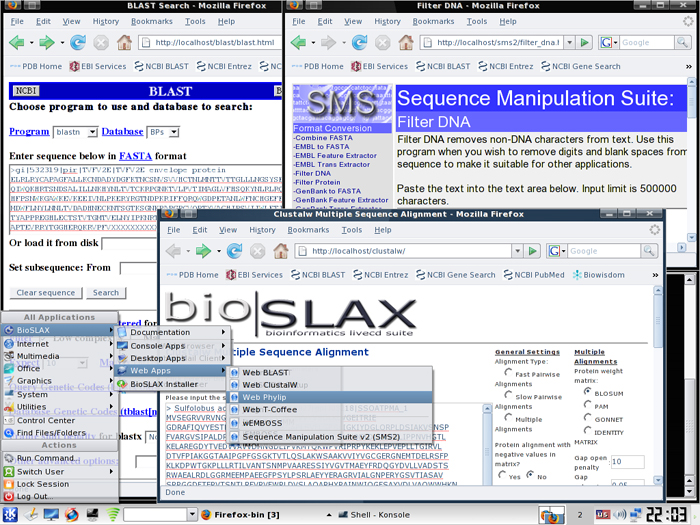

To date, there have been two versions of BioSLAX - version 5.x based on Slax 5 and version 7.x based on Slax 6. While 5.x followed the version numbers of Slax 5, version 7 adopted a new version numbering which is one higher than the Slax version on which it is based. Latest versions can be downloaded from the BioSLAX website.

=== BioSLAX 5.x ===
BioSLAX 5.x was based mostly on Slax version 5.1.8, running earlier versions of Linux kernel 2.6 and KDE 3.4, with unionfs.

==== BioSLAX 5.x editions ====
===== Standard User Edition =====
This edition runs the KDE X Window System GUI, and includes all tools and application suites, but no compiler tools nor the Linux kernel source code and headers. This is mainly suited for users who only need to use the tools and application suites. It is small, making it easy to download and useful in areas with limited internet bandwidth.

===== Developer Edition =====
This edition runs the KDE X Window GUI and includes all tools and application suites, a full set of development and compiler tools, and the Linux kernel source code and headers. This edition is more for a power user, who needs various tools and applications, and must compile new applications or create new application modules for BioSLAX.

===== Server Edition =====
This edition includes no X Window GUI, compiling tools, Linux kernel source, or kernel headers. It is meant to be used mainly as a remote server, where users must either Secure Shell (SSH) in to use the command line applications, or connect to the server via the web to access the available web-based portals to popular bio applications.

===== NUS LSM Edition =====
This edition is the Developer Edition, customized for use by the NUS Life Science Curriculum for the teaching of bioinformatics.

===== Taverna Edition =====
This edition is the Developer Edition which includes TaveRNA. The TaveRNA Project aims to provide a language and software tools to facilitate easy use of workflow and distributed compute technology.

=== BioSLAX 7.x ===
BioSLAX 7.x is based on Slax 6 and features the later releases of the Linux kernel 2.6, KDE 3.5, and using aufs and lzma compression. The biggest change is use of this version as either client or server. The distribution was also moved from CD to DVD, allowing for more applications to be introduced, which were formerly left out of version 5.x to save space. The ability to boot from a File Allocation Table (FAT) or extended file system (EXT) formatted USB drive was also introduced in Slax 6, hence BioSLAX 7.x versions also had this feature, effectively enabling persistent file handling which are unavailable on the CD/DVD as they are not (re-)writable.

=== BioSLAX 8 ===
Versions of BioSLAX after 7.x have been delayed due to the base distribution's (Slax) developer, Tomáš Matějíček, refusing to move forward with a new version because of family commitments. However, his main reason for not moving forward was that he was waiting for Squash FS and LZMA to be integrated into the Linux kernel by default, instead of users needing to apply separate patches. As of kernel 2.6.38, the integration was finally done, prompting Matějíček to look at a new version of Slax, which will therefore result in a new version of BioSLAX in coming months. One can follow his thoughts on the new version of Slax on his blog.

== Features ==
=== Standard tools ===
BioSLAX features the Linux Slackware 12.1 operating system with updated drivers for various network adapters including support for many varied wireless cards. It also has many useful basic tools and applications such as:

- Perl (including BioPerl modules)
- PHP
- APACHE II
- MySQL
- OpenOffice.org
- KPDF Reader
- Mozilla Firefox
- Mozilla Thunderbird
- gFTP
- ProFTPd
- OpenSSH
- Kopete Instant Messenger
- VNC Viewer
- Remote Desktop Services

=== BioInformatics tools ===
The bioinformatics tools and applications are subdivided into three main categories.

==== Console apps ====
- BLAST
- BlastCL3
- BioGrep
- ClustalW
- EMBOSS
- Genesplicer
- GlimmerHMM
- HMMER
- Modeller
- PamL
- PHYLIP
- Primer3
- R (programming language) & Bioconductor
- T-Coffee

==== Desktop apps ====
- ACT
- Artemis
- ClustalX (GUI-based ClustalW)
- JAligner
- Jalview
- jEMBOSS (Java EMBOSS Suite)
- Jmol
- NJPlot
- Pymol
- ReadSEQ
- TreeView
- Weka (machine learning)

==== Web apps ====
- Web BLAST
- Web ClustalW
- Web PHYLIP
- Web T-Coffee
- wEMBOSS (Web-based EMBOSS suite)
- Sequence Manipulation Suite (SMS)

=== Installing to hard disk ===
A useful aspect of Slax-based distributions is how easy it is to convert a live OS into a full Linux system installed on the hard drive of any PC, which will use roughly 3.5 GB of space.

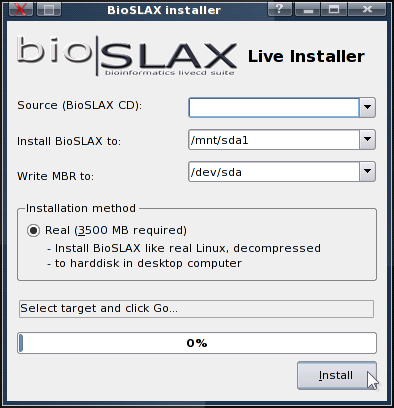
A tool, written with the KDE Kommander toolkit named the BioSLAX Installer is provided for users to easily convert a live OS to a full Linux installation. By using modules to customize the distribution, and then using the installer, users can rapidly deploy fully installed customized clients.

== Future plans ==
=== BioSLAX updates ===
BioSLAX will be updated as newer Slackware (or Slax) versions are released. The tools and applications suites will also be monitored for significant changes and upgraded as necessary. Some tools may be removed to make way for other tools which can do the same thing but with added functionality and better efficiency. More web-based portals are being looked at, for example, portals to ReadSeq, Primer3 and Genesplicer are in the pipeline.

=== Grid deployment ===
The developers were also looking at integrating various Grid computing platforms with BioSLAX. Because BioSLAX can be booted up immediately from any CD/DVD/USB, it can be used as a rapidly deployable Grid-enabled Operating System. One such Grid platform was the Univa Grid platform. Using the Univa Grid MP agent, it was shown during GridAsia 2009 in a talk given by Tan Tin Wee, that the agent, once modularized on BioSLAX, can be used to Grid enable machines from any location as slave-nodes to a master-node located elsewhere, effectively creating a "global-wide grid".

=== BioSLAX on the cloud ===
In a proof-of-concept endeavour, the developers successfully deployed BioSLAX as instances on a pool of resources using both VMWare's ESXi and Citrix Xen's Hypervisors. Their aim was to effectively create a "BioSLAX CLOUD" where students and staff may instantiate any number BioSLAX servers dynamically for research and education (conduct bioinformatics practical labs by having students connect to the servers via suitable X Window clients such as X-Win32, VNC, Exceed and NoMachine NX) or deployed in such a manner which when used in conjunction with the UD Grid MPAgent may be used to form a cluster for processing large jobs.

The proof-of-concept was highly successful in being deployed for research and education for the Life Science Curriculum at NUS and in 2011, a number of the BioSLAX cloud instances, both on VMWare's vSphere and Citrix Xen servers, were used in the APBioNet project, BioDB100. The backend controls and automation were created and implemented using the various APIs for vSphere and Xen by Mr. Mark De Silva.

Developers were also in talks with Amazon from 2009 to 2010 to deploy similar BioSLAX cloud images on Amazon EC2, hoping to move some of their research and education machines over to Amazon, to cut costs on hardware. Discussions, however, fell through when it was clear that Amazon would not support full hardware virtualization which was needed to run BioSLAX images on the cloud. Supporting only para-virtualizaion is the stand of most commercial cloud providers using Citrix Xen hypervisors. Until the mind-set of these entities change, private clouds running Citrix Xen hypervisors configured for full hardware virtualization or VMWare vSphere clouds will be the only clouds able to run BioSLAX.

== See also ==
- BioLinux
