= SquashFS =

Compressed read-only file system for Linux

Squashfs
- Developer(s): Phillip Lougher, Robert Lougher
- Introduced: 2002 with Linux

Limits
- Max volume size: 16 EiB (2^{64}) bytes
- Max file size: 16 EiB (2^{64}) bytes

Features
- Attributes: POSIX and extended attributes
- Transparent compression: gzip LZMA LZO LZMA2 LZ4 Zstd

Other
- Supported operating systems: Linux
- Website: github.com/plougher/squashfs-tools

Squashfs is a compressed read-only file system for Linux. Squashfs compresses files, inodes and directories, and supports block sizes from 4 KiB up to 1 MiB for greater compression. Several compression algorithms are supported. Squashfs is also the name of free software, licensed under the GPL, for accessing Squashfs filesystems.

Squashfs is intended for general read-only file-system use and in constrained block-device memory systems (e.g. embedded systems) where low overhead is needed.

== Uses ==
Squashfs is used by the Live CD versions of Arch Linux, Clonezilla, Debian, Fedora, Gentoo Linux, KDE neon, Kali Linux, Linux Mint, NixOS, Salix, Ubuntu, openSUSE and on embedded distributions such as the OpenWrt and DD-WRT router firmware. It is also used in Chromecast and EasyOS, in Tiny Core Linux for packaging extension, and for the system partitions of some Android releases (Android Nougat). It is often combined with a union mount filesystem, such as UnionFS, OverlayFS, or aufs, to provide a read-write environment for live Linux distributions. This takes advantage of both Squashfs's high-speed compression abilities and the ability to alter the distribution while running it from a live CD. Distributions such as Debian Live, Mandriva One, Puppy Linux, Salix Live and Slax use this combination. The AppImage project, which aims to create portable Linux applications, uses Squashfs for creating AppImages. The snap package system also uses Squashfs as its file container format.

Squashfs is also used by Linux Terminal Server Project and Splashtop. The tools unsquashfs and mksquashfs have been ported to Windows NT – Windows 8.1. 7-Zip also supports Squashfs.

== History ==
Squashfs was initially maintained as an out-of-tree Linux patch. The initial version 1.0 was released on 23 October 2002. In 2009 Squashfs was merged into Linux mainline as part of Linux 2.6.29. In that process, the backward-compatibility code for older formats was removed. Since then the Squashfs kernel-space code has been maintained in the Linux mainline tree, while the user-space tools remain on the project's GitHub page.

The original version of Squashfs used gzip compression, although Linux kernel 2.6.34 added support for LZMA and LZO compression, Linux kernel 2.6.38 added support for LZMA2 compression (which is used by xz), Linux kernel 3.19 added support for LZ4 compression, and Linux kernel 4.14 added support for Zstandard compression.

Linux kernel 2.6.35 added support for extended file attributes.

== See also ==
- Comparison of file systems
- List of file systems
- Reboot to restore software
- Windows Imaging Format
