= Kanotix =

Linux distribution

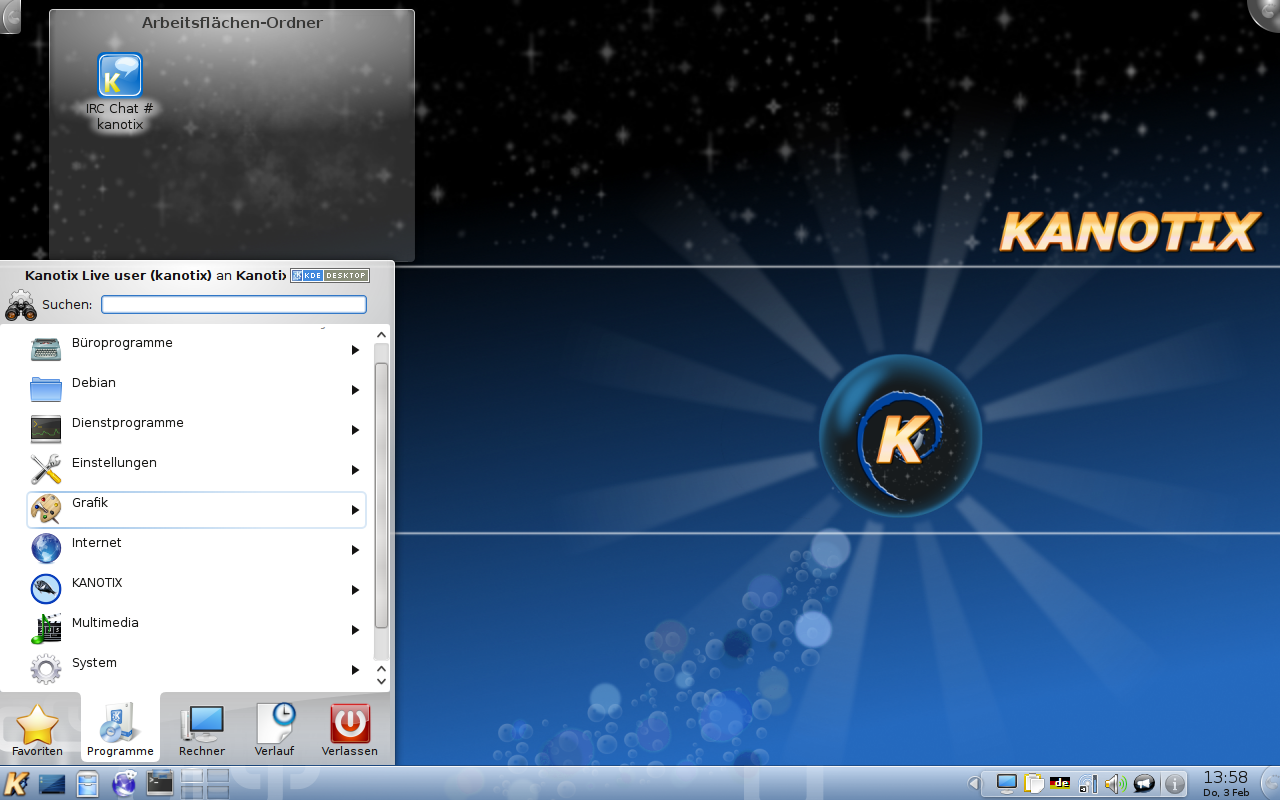
- Kanotix-Hellfire-Live-screenshot
- Developer: Jörg Schirottke (Aka. Kano)
- OS family: Linux (Unix-like)
- Working state: Current
- Source model: Open-source
- Released to manufacturing: May 25, 2025
- Latest release: Kanotix-Slowfire 2024 / April 1, 2024
- Latest preview: Kanotix-Towelfire 2025
- Kernel type: Monolithic
- Default user interface: KDE Plasma Desktop, LXDE
- License: mostly DFSG, non-free firmware
- Official website: www.kanotix.com

Kanotix, also referred to as KANOTIX, is an operating system based on Debian, with advanced hardware detection. It can run from an optical disc drive or other media i.e. USB-stick without using a hard disk drive.

Kanotix uses KDE Software Compilation as the default desktop environment. Since 2013 the newer releases ship with LXDE as a second lightweight desktop environment. Unlike other similar Linux-distributions Kanotix is a rolling release. Nightly builds are automated builds every night of the latest development code of KANOTIX and with the latest packages from the repositories. The name "Kanotix" is derived from the founder's nickname "Kano". Kanotix's mascot is a fangtooth.

== Content ==
Kanotix is based on the newest Debian stable. It also provides its own packages and scripts and many backports. Kanotix also provides an optimized kernel with additional patches.

Kanotix includes about 1,500 software packages, among others

- KDE Software Compilation, the default desktop environment and LXDE the lightweight version
- Amarok, Video Disk Recorder
- Internet access software, including KDE Network Manager, KPPP dialer, Wireless LAN-driver and NdisWrapper
- Firefox web browser, Thunderbird mail/news client, Pidgin instant messenger
- K3b, for CD (and DVD) authoring and backup
- GIMP, an image-manipulation program, also Inkscape a free and open-source vector graphics editor
- GParted and other tools for data rescue and system repair
- Network analysis and administration tools
- LibreOffice, the office suite (backports)
- Programming and development tools
- NTFS-3G used by default
- Automatic installation of graphic-drivers with nvidia and fglrx-scripts with dkms support.
- Scripts for additional multimedia support (current mplayer-versions)
- Wine (Software) updated to newest versions

== Usage ==
Kanotix is designed for multiple-purpose usage so that it can be used in live mode on different types of media (DVD, hard disk, and USB flash drive) and includes an installation tool for installing Kanotix to the hard drive. The distribution ships with the latest kernel which is carefully patched with fixes and drivers for most modern hardware. Kanotix is an ideal tool for testing, data rescue, or for working and safe surfing and mailing on different machines e.g. in an Internet cafe.

=== Live mode ===
The Live mode allows it to work without any installation. As Kanotix comes with unionfs and aufs-support one can "install" additional packages by using APT (via connection to the Internet). For USB-users the so-called "persistent mode" allows to save data changes back to the USB storage device and the stored data and customized settings can be used again on following boots. Using USB flash drive (when supported by BIOS), is of course much faster than booting from CD or DVD.

=== Installation ===
Kanotix can be installed to the hard disk using the (graphical) acritoxinstaller, which, depending on optical drive, hard disk and processor speed, can take around 10–20 minutes. The acritoxinstaller is a KDE/Qt frontend and a bash backend and comes with a user-friendly interface and several advanced features: e.g. LVM support, dmraid support, automatic partitioning (including ntfsresize-support), installation to USB-HDDs.

== Versions ==
=== History (2003–2006) ===
The distribution derived from "Kano's Scriptpage for Knoppix". He wrote about Knoppix: "I like it much, but I had to improve it :)". One of the main differences from Knoppix was the support of hard disk installation. The first "Kanotix"-preview was released at 24 December 2003 "KANOTIX XMAS 2003 PREVIEW". In 2004 and 2005 KANOTIX was a popular distribution ranking in the top 20 of distrowatch.com. In 2004 the releases were named "Bug Hunter" (Bug Hunter-01-2004 - X-2004).

After problems with the stability in 2006 Jörg "Kano" Schirottke decided to move from Debian Sid to a less volatile basis. The co-developer and others of the Kanotix-team wanted to stay with Debian-Sid and left the project, to start sidux, a new distribution based on Debian sid. The last Kanotix release based on Debian Sid was 2006-01-RC4.

=== Versions based on Debian stable (2007–current) ===
==== Kanotix-Thorhammer-Release 2007 ====
The first Release based on Debian-stable was the Kanotix-Thorhammer in 2007. After the Debian-Etch-Release in April 2007 Kanotix was no longer compatible with Debian Sid. As such a howto was given, "Steps to update right", to move a KANOTIX-installation to the new base by dist-upgrade.

After 3 months of development and several beta Releases the new Kanotix-2007-Thorhammer-RC6 was publicly available for download. The last published version was Kanotix-2007-Thorhammer-RC7. The development in 2008 featured continuously kernel-updates and a lot of backports in the Thorhammer-repository. Some of the additional packages were adaptations for netbooks and notebooks. A highlighted additional backport was OpenOffice.org 3.2.x

==== Kanotix-Excalibur-2010 ====
The (old) stable Release 2010 Kanotix-Excalibur was based on Debian 5 ("Lenny") and had compared to Thorhammer some basic changes (based on Debian-Live, bootloader Grub2). Furthermore, Kanotix-Excalibur was available for 32-Bit and 64-Bit architecture and a 2in1 iso with both. Additionally there are Kanotix Excalibur 2010 KDE4 (KDE SC 4.3.2) versions available and an "all-in-one"-DVD.iso. Kanotix-Excalibur contains the more up-to-date Ubuntu-kernels 2.6.32-BFS with special patches. During the development most of the Kanotix-Excalibur-test.iso were not published but accessible to the community. A first "Preview"-Version was published on December 27, 2009. The final Kanotix-Excalibur-2010 was released on 8 June 2010, just in time for LinuxTag 2010.

==== Kanotix-Hellfire-2011-2012 ====
The next stable version, code-name Kanotix-Hellfire is based on Debian 6 ("Squeeze"). It ships with KDE Software Compilation 4 for 32-Bit and 64-Bit architecture and a complete new branding stuff, new kernel (2.6.38), LibreOffice 3.3.2 and more. An updated version Kanotix-Hellfire 2011-05 was released with the project's presentation at LinuxTag 2011 in Berlin and again with version Kanotix-Hellfire 2012-05 one year later during the LinuxTag 2012 With the so-called "GFX overlays" that enable to use Nvidia or ATI 3D graphics driver in live mode, Kanotix-Hellfire provides this new feature first time.

==== Kanotix-Dragonfire-2012-2014 ====
This version, ("old stable") code-name Kanotix-Dragonfire is based on Debian 7 ("Wheezy"). A Preview of this Kanotix-Version was offered at LinuxTag 2012 in several versions in 32 and 64 bit. Also a new repository for Kanotix-Dragonfire was added with backported KDE4.8 packages (amd64 and i386). New features in Kanotix-Dragonfire are: booting from/with DVD, USB, UEFI (PCs, Intel Macs), an embedded USB-Stick ImageWriter for Mac OS X and the USB-Stick with Hybrid-ISO can now be made persistent from the live-system.

A preview of the current release "Kanotix-acritox-trialshot" was announced on 14 February 2013. A special "CeBIT" edition was released "as a Technology Demonstration" on 8 March 2013.

A new official Kanotix-Dragonfire was announced from LinuxTag 2013 in Berlin. Beside KDE as default desktop environment the new release ships with LXDE as a second lightweight desktop environment. In the KDE-Special version the extra 3D graphics drivers from nvidia and AMD and the Steam-client are already preinstalled.

An updated release of the stable Kanotix was presented at LinuxTag 2014 in Berlin.

==== Kanotix-Spitfire-2014-2016 ====
Kanotix Spitfire is based on Debian 8 ("Jessie"). Several Kanotix-LinuxTag images for 32 and 64 bit were offered for download.

After the Release of Debian GNU/Linux 8.0 (2015-04-26) a reset of the "nightly builds" with the official Debian kernel-version 3.16.7 started Kanotix-Spitfire as a "rolling release" of the current stable Kanotix. The Images are maintained by developer Kano and offered for download "Kanotix Downloads" and on kanotix.acritox.com The latest Kanotix modification of Kanotix-Spitfire has been presented at OpenRheinRuhr 2015 in Oberhausen.

==== Kanotix-Steelfire-2017-2019 ====
Kanotix Steelfire is based on current stable Debian 9 ("Stretch"). Two months after the Release of Debian GNU/Linux 9.0 (2017-06-17) the first iso-images of Kanotix-steelfire-nightly-LXDE were released. The KDE-modification of Kanotix-Spitfire was releast and presented later at OpenRheinRuhr 2017 in Oberhausen. (2017-11-4/5) All Images of "Kanotix-Steelfire" are available as KDE and LXDE versions in 32 and 64 bit.

==== Kanotix-Silverfire-2019-2020 ====
Kanotix-Silverfire is based on Debian 10 ("Buster"). Just like its Debian base Kanotix-Silverfire was in the "testing"-mode. Some "previews" with KDE and LXDE in 32- and 64-bit variants are linked on the homepage. With the Release of Debian-10 (Buster), Kanotix-Silverfire became stable too.

==== Kanotix-Slowfire-2024 ====
Kanotix-Slowfire is a edition based on Debian 12 ("Bookworm"). Just like the earlier Kanotix-Images the Nightly-Builds are released in 5 versions: The KDE and LXDE desktop environment, both in 64 and 32 Bit and the small Kanotix-Image -eeepc4G. In the KANOTIX tradition of rolling-release the Nightly-builds are automated builds every night of the latest development and the latest packages from the repositories. New is the Calamares-Installer (now in test version), wayland, refind, the current LibreOffice and a new kernel (6.6-13.1).

==== Kanotix-Towelfire-2025 ====
Kanotix-Towelfire is a preview-edition based on Debian 13 ("Trixie"). The first preview was releast on Towel Day 25-05-2025. The Nightly-Builds are released in 3 versions: The KDE and LXDE desktop environment, in 64 bit versions and the small Kanotix-Image -eeepc4G. In the KANOTIX tradition of rolling-release the Nightly-builds are automated builds every night of the latest development and the latest packages from the repositories. The Calamares-Installer (in test version), wayland, refind, the current LibreOffice and a new kernel (6.12-27).

=== Release timeline ===
Kanotix based on Debian-stable
| Version | Date | Name | Debian-Version |
|---|---|---|---|
| 2025- | since 2025-05-25 | Towelfire-Nightly-Build | 13 Trixie |
| 2024- | since 2024-04-01 | Slowfire-Nightly-Build | 12 Bookworm |
| 2020- | since 2020-04-13 | Silverfire-Nightly Extra ISO | 10.4 Buster |
| 2019- | since 2019-07-06 | Silverfire-Nightly-Build current | 10.0 Buster |
| 2017- | since 2017-11-04 | Steelfire-Nightly-Build-KDE | 9.0 Stretch |
| 2017- | since 2017-08-27 | Steelfire-Nightly-Build-LXDE | 9.0 Stretch |
| 2015- | since 2015-04-26 | Spitfire-Nightly Build | 8.0 Jessie |
| 2014-05 | 2014-05-11 | Spitfire LinuxTag 2014 | 8.0 Jessie |
| 2014-05 | 2014-05-11 | Dragonfire LinuxTag 2014 | 7.0 Wheezy |
| 2013-05 | 2013-05-22 | Dragonfire LinuxTag 2013 | 7.0 Wheezy |
| 2013-03 | 2013-03-06 | Dragonfire CeBIT-Edition | 7.0 Wheezy |
| 2012-05 | 2012-05-23 | Dragonfire 2012-05 | 7.0 Wheezy |
| 2012-05 | 2012-05-23 | Hellfire 2012-05 | 6.0 Squeeze |
| 2011-05 | 2011-05-11 | Hellfire 2011-05 | 6.0 Squeeze |
| 2011-03 | 2011-03-02 | Hellfire 2011-03 | 6.0 Squeeze |
| 2010 | 2010-06-08 | Excalibur | 5.0 Lenny |
| 2009 | 2009-12-27 | Excalibur (Preview) | 5.0 Lenny |
| 2007 | 2007-12-31 | Thorhammer (RC7) | 4.0 Etch |
| 2007 | 2007-09-15 | Thorhammer (RC6) | 4.0 Etch |

Kanotix based on Debian-unstable (until 2006)
| Version | Date | Name |
|---|---|---|
| 01-2006 | 2006-10-02 | 2006-01 (RC4) |
| 2006 | 2006-05-14 | 2006-VDR (RC6) |
| 2006 | 2006-05-14 | 2006-Easter (RC4) |
| 2006 | 2006-03-11 | 2006-CeBit (RC3) |
| 2005-04 | 2005-12-31 | |
| 2005-03 | 2005-06-06 | |
| 2005-02 | 2005-04-10 | |
| 2005-01 | 2005-02-12 | |
| 10-2004 | 2004-11-28 | Bug Hunter X |
| 09-2004 | 2004-10-17 | Bug Hunter 09 |
| 08-2004 | 2004-09-20 | Bug Hunter 08 |
| 07-2004 | 2004-07-29 | Bug Hunter 07 |
| 06-2004 | 2004-07-01 | Bug Hunter 06 |
| 05-2004 | 2004-04-23 | Bug Hunter 05 |
| 04-2004 | 2004-03-19 | Bug Hunter 04 |
| 03-2004 | 2004-03-02 | Bug Hunter 03 |
| 02-2004 | 2004-02-07 | Bug Hunter 02 |
| 01-2004 | 2004-02-03 | Bug Hunter 01 |
| 01-2003 | 2003-12-24 | XMAS Preview |

== See also ==
- Debian
- Linux
- Parsix
