= En garde =

En garde is French for "On [your] guard", a warning term in fencing.

En garde or En Garde may refer to:

- En Garde! (role-playing game), a 1975 role-playing game from Game Designers' Workshop
- En Garde!, a 1987 role-playing game from Ragnarök Speldesign
- En Garde (album), an album by the band Criteria
- "En Garde" (Modern Family), an episode of the television series Modern Family
- En Garde (novel), a novel in the Nancy Drew: Girl Detective series
- EnGarde Secure Linux
- En Garde! (video game), a video game by Fireplace Games.
