= Runt (disambiguation) =

A runt is a smaller specimen in a group of animals, usually of offspring in a litter.

Runt or Runts may also refer to:

== Arts and entertainment ==
=== Fictional characters ===
- Runt, of the duo Rita and Runt, in the TV series Animaniacs
- Runt, in the video game Simon the Sorcerer II: The Lion, the Wizard and the Wardrobe
- Runt, in the film Disco Pigs
- Runts, characters in the video game Quadrun
- The Runts, a gang in the film City of God
- Runt, in the 2005 Disney film Chicken Little

=== Other arts and entertainment ===
- Runt (album), a 1970 album by Todd Rundgren, originally credited to the band Runt
- Runt. The Ballad of Todd Rundgren, a 1971 album by Todd Rundgren
- Rex the Runt, a British claymation series
- Runt (novel), a 2002 children's novel by Marion Dane Bauer
- Runt (2020 film), a 2020 American thriller film
- Runt, a 2022 children's novel by Craig Silvey
  - Runt (2024 film), the 2024 film adaptation

== People ==
- C. W. Bishop (1890–1971), U.S. Congressman from Illinois nicknamed "Runt"
- Runt Marr (1891–1981), American baseball player, manager and scout
- Runt Wolfe, pseudonym of Moe Berg (1902–1972), Major League Baseball Player and World War II Allied spy
- Brother Runt or simply Runt, ringname of Matt Hyson (Spike Dudley), American professional wrestler

== Science and technology ==
- RUNT Linux, ResNet USB Network Tester, a Linux distro
- Runt domain, an evolutionary conserved protein domain
- Runt frame, an Ethernet frame shorter than the minimum of 64 bytes
- The "Runt" device, a prototype hydrogen bomb detonated in the Castle Romeo test
- Runt pulse, a narrow pulse that does not reach a valid high or low level

== Other uses ==
- Runt Distribution, a US record company
- Runts, a brand of candy
- Runt (typography), a very short ending to a paragraph occupying its own line that's mostly blank
