= On Guard =

On Guard may refer to:

== Film and television ==
- On Guard (serial), a 1927 film serial
- On Guard (1984 film), an Australian film
- On Guard (1997 film), a French swashbuckler film
- "On Guard" (White Collar), a 2011 TV episode

== Other uses ==
- On Guard, a 1903 novel by Upton Sinclair
- "On Guard", a 2021 song by Lauren Jauregui
- "On Guard", a 2001 song by Le Tigre from Feminist Sweepstakes
- Among Us Story: On Guard

== See also ==
- En garde (disambiguation)
