= CloudBioLinux =

CloudBioLinux is an open-source project providing machine images for bioinformatics on cloud computing platforms. CloudBioLinux provides a build and deployment system which can deploy directly to desktop machines, to desktop Virtual Machines (VMs), or to cloud providers such as the Amazon Elastic Compute Cloud (EC2). The project also provides a pre-built Amazon Machine Image (AMI) for use on Amazon EC2, and downloadable pre-built virtual machine images for the desktop virtual machine software VirtualBox and for use on a private Eucalyptus cloud.

== Related projects ==
BioLinux provides linux distributions configured for bioinformatics. The CloudBioLinux project grew out of the BioLinux project.

The open-source CloudMan project builds on CloudBioLinux and Galaxy to provide pre-configured Galaxy virtual clusters on cloud computing platforms.
