= Puredyne =

puredyne

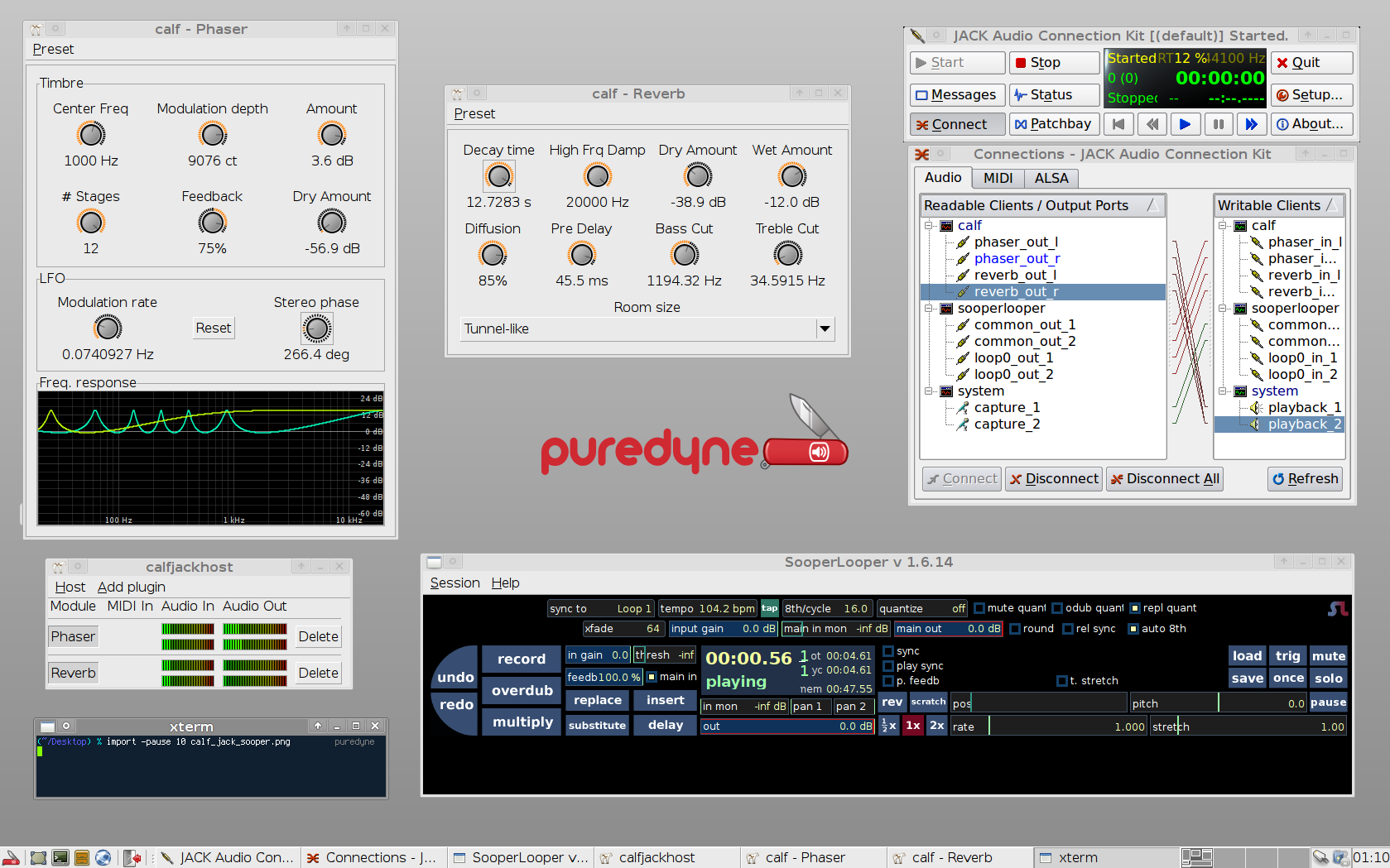
- puredyne running audio software
- Developer: GOTO10
- OS family: Linux (Unix-like)
- Working state: discontinued
- Source model: Open source
- Latest release: carrot&coriander / 2010-01-16
- Supported platforms: x86, Apple–Intel architecture, x86-64
- Kernel type: Monolithic kernel
- Default user interface: Graphical (xfce)
- License: Various
- Official website: web.archive.org/web/20120527175141/http://puredyne.org/

puredyne is a discontinued live Linux distribution based on Ubuntu and Debian Live and dedicated to live audio-and-visual processing and streaming. Its focus was on the Pure Data audio synthesis system as well as SuperCollider, Csound and others, plus live video-processing systems such as Processing and Fluxus. It also included hardware related software such as Arduino and came bundled with home-studio and graphic design software (Ardour, JACK, GIMP, Inkscape, etc.).

Development of puredyne was supported by the Arts Council England. Puredyne was a featured download on productivity weblog Lifehacker and was named as one of the two software of year 2010 by the PixelAche network of electronic festivals.

The conclusion of the Puredyne project was announced on the Puredyne mailing list in February 2012. Reasons stated for this decision involve difficulty in maintaining the distribution, and a lack of consensus with regard to future direction. The final version is the 10.10 Gazpacho beta.

== Teaching ==
The main goal of puredyne was to provide a portable and easy to install live distribution to simplify the teaching of sound and video processing software which is either absent from the standard Linux distributions or incomplete. Its live distribution format was well-suited for workshops and for usage at universities and institutions with locked down workstations.

== Media art ==
Another aspect of puredyne is that it was maintained by media artists for media artists. The system provided particular optimizations at the kernel and compilation level to make the most out of i686 machines for real-time audio and video. As a consequence, this operating system is well suited for live performances and art installations. The modular aspect makes it easy for artists to customize and deploy it quickly to their own project needs.

== Live distribution ==
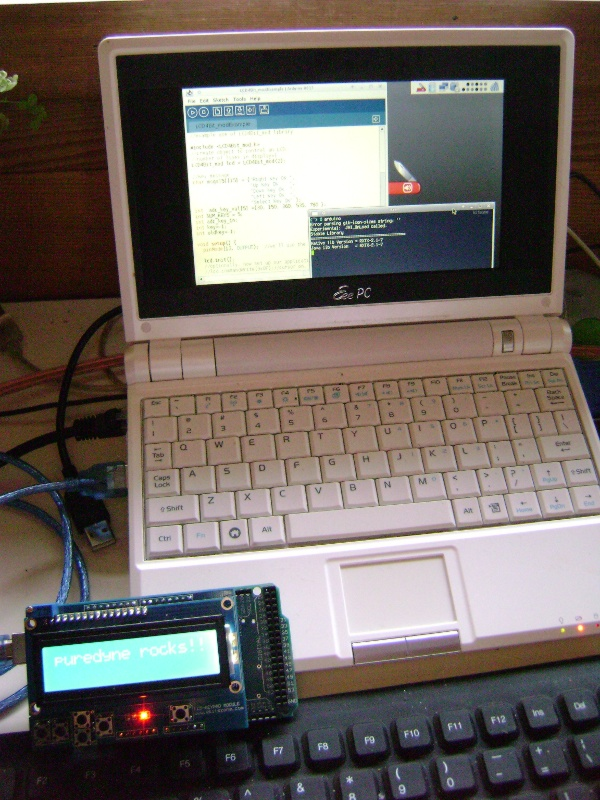
puredyne running on an Asus Eee and controlling an Arduino board

Used as a Live CD, puredyne is a complete Linux multimedia desktop environment that can run from virtually any x86 machine. The system can be booted from a CD, DVD, or USB stick. Thanks to AuFS and the Debian Live system, it is possible to combine the CD and save all system changes, including new drivers and software, in any storage device (from hard-disk to USB sticks and other flash memory). Installing puredyne can be done in several ways. The fastest is just a matter of copying a folder from the CD to the Hard-Drive (liveHD) or to a flash key (liveUSB). The system is truly a live distribution as it remains unchanged no matter which medium it is booted from. The system also comes with GCC and special SDK tools to facilitate the modification of the distribution, the addition of new software and the creation of new ISO images.

== History ==
Puredyne was started by Aymeric Mansoux, and for a long time, exclusively developed by members from the GOTO10 collective. It was initially based on the dyne:bolic multimedia Linux distribution, and focused mostly on Pure Data, hence the name. The later "leek and potato" release in January 2009 marked a transition to Debian, and the January 2010 release was primarily Ubuntu-based but with Debian tools.

== See also ==
- Comparison of Linux distributions
- Software art
