= DemoLinux =

Linux distribution

DemoLinux was one of the first Live CD Linux distributions. It was created by Roberto Di Cosmo, Vincent Balat and Jean-Vincent Loddo, in 1998.

The DemoLinux CD was created to make it possible to use Linux without having to install it on the hard disk. It was the first Linux Live CD that made it possible to use the system in graphic mode and without any stage of configuration.

There are many other Live CD Linux distributions today. DemoLinux can be considered to be the ancestor of Knoppix.

DemoLinux offered the user hundreds of applications (among them KDE and StarOffice), owing to using to a compressed file system. The CD could be used without any modification to the hard disk; however, the user could use space on the hard disk to store their personal data and install additional applications using the distribution's standard tools. Version 1 was based on Mandrake Linux (now Mandriva Linux), while versions 2 and 3 were based mainly on Debian. These later versions made it possible to install Linux on the hard disk. DemoLinux thus provided a very simple installation procedure for Debian and became a forerunner of later Linux distributions.

DemoLinux has been distributed with many computer magazines in several countries. It is still downloadable from the official website, but has not evolved since 2002.

- Red Hat Linux
- - DemoLinux
  - - ALT Linux
    - - - TinyMe
        - - Granular Linux
          - - Phinx
            - PCLinuxOS
      - - SAM Linux → SAMity Linux
        - - BlackPanther OS
          - - OpenSLS → Annvix
            - - Unity Linux
              - - Mageia
                - - - OpenMandriva Lx
                    - Mandrake Linux → Mandriva
                  - ROSA Linux
