= Granular Linux =

Linux distribution

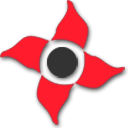

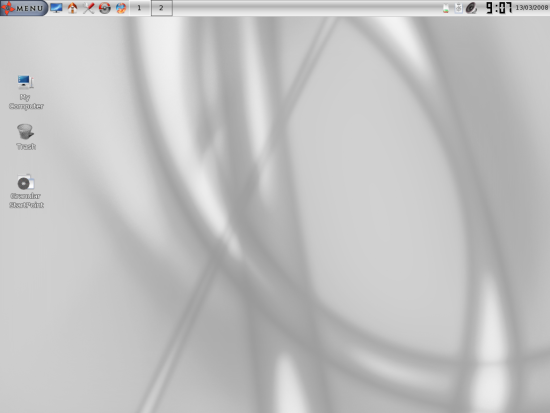
- Granular Linux 1.0
- Developer: Team Granular
- OS family: Linux (Unix-like)
- Working state: Discontinued
- Source model: Open source
- Kernel type: Monolithic (Linux)
- Default user interface: KDE, Enlightenment
- License: Various
- Official website: www.granularproject.org

Granular, or Granular Linux, was a Linux distribution targeted at common desktop users. Granular was based on PCLinuxOS and came as an installable live CD. The CD version of Granular featured two desktop environments – KDE and a development version of Enlightenment. Where KDE is a full-featured desktop environment, Enlightenment is a lightweight desktop shell which is markedly faster than KDE.

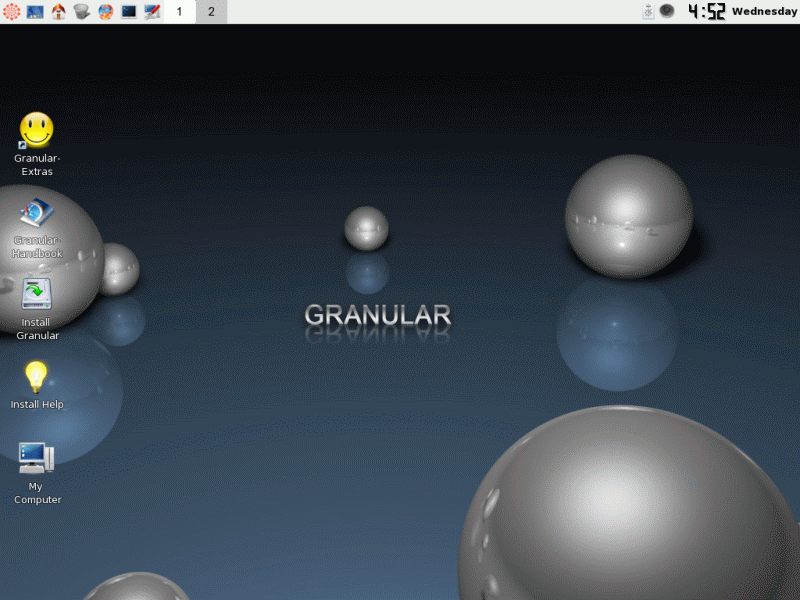
Granular v0.25 was the first release that featured two desktop environments – KDE and Xfce

== History ==
Granular had its roots in India. The Granular Linux Project kicked off in October 2006, when its first demonstration was given to some college students. The first release that was made available for download on 30 December 2006.

The main idea behind the birth of the project was to redefine the application set included in PCLinuxOS to some extent and to introduce the idea of having more than one major desktop environment on a single LiveCD. The latter idea was implemented beginning from the second version release of Granular – version 0.25 – where two desktop environments (KDE and Xfce) were included, KDE being highly customizable and feature-rich but resource heavy, and Xfce being a light-weight yet feature-full desktop environment.

After v0.25, came out v0.90, and finally v1.0. Granular 1.0 (code name Esto Vox) was the last of the "Esto" series; the first was 0.90 (Esto Vello).

In October 2007, a special DVD edition of Granular 0.90 was released with the name "FunWorks", which featured the LG3D desktop environment along with three others and a host of many other software and games.

Granular utilized the PCLinuxOS repository and its own as well for software/package management. Granular's own repository was opened in March 2008, and since then, it had been a source of all Granular-specific RPM packages, some of which were not available in the PCLinuxOS repository.

- Red Hat Linux
- - DemoLinux
  - - ALT Linux
    - - - TinyMe
        - - Granular Linux
          - - Phinx
            - PCLinuxOS
      - - SAM Linux → SAMity Linux
        - - BlackPanther OS
          - - OpenSLS → Annvix
            - - Unity Linux
              - - Mageia
                - - - OpenMandriva Lx
                    - Mandrake Linux → Mandriva
                  - ROSA Linux

== Features ==
Granular came as a LiveCD, which meant you didn't have to install it to try it. The standard CD version of Granular included two desktop environments – KDE and Enlightenment 17. Like PCLinuxOS, Granular used Synaptic Package Manager, a GUI frontend to APT, for package management (installing, updating, or removing packages). Granular came with a Perl-based script mklivecd which made it possible to remaster Granular or create a backup CD/DVD out of the installed system. It also included Granular StartPoint, which was HTML-based and acted as a primer to the various major software included in Granular.
