= Tinfoil Hat Linux =

Security-focused Linux distribution

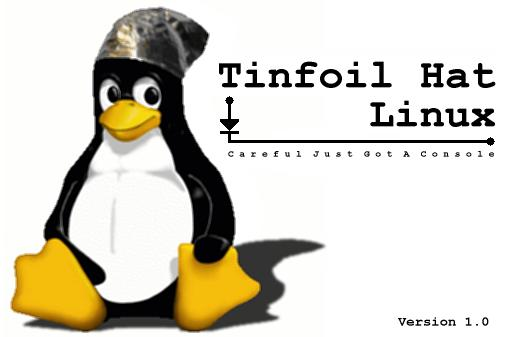
- Developer: Shmoo Group
- OS family: Linux (Unix-like)
- Working state: Discontinued
- Source model: Open source
- Latest release: 1.0 / February 2002; 24 years ago
- Supported platforms: i386
- Kernel type: Monolithic kernel
- Default user interface: CLI / Bourne shell
- License: Documentation: Modified BSD license Software: Original licences
- Official website: tinfoilhat.shmoo.com

Tinfoil Hat Linux (THL) is a compact security-focused Linux distribution designed for high security developed by The Shmoo Group. The first version (1.000) was released in February 2002. By 2013, it had become a low-priority project. Its image files and source are available in gzip format. THL can be used on modern PCs using an Intel 80386 with at least 8 MB of RAM. The distribution fits on a single HD floppy disk. The small footprint provides additional benefits beyond making the system easy to understand and verify. A hard drive is not required to use THL, making it easier to "sanitize" the computer after use.

The logo of Tinfoil Hat is Tux, the Linux mascot, wearing a tinfoil hat.

The The Shmoo Group website says "It started as a secure, single floppy, bootable Linux distribution for storing PGP keys and then encrypting, signing, and wiping files. At some point, it became an exercise in over-engineering."

== Security features ==
Tinfoil Hat uses a number of measures to defeat hardware and software surveillance methods like keystroke logging, video camera, and TEMPEST:

- Encryption — GNU Privacy Guard (GPG) public key cryptography software is included in THL.
- Data retrieval — All temporary files are created on an encrypted RAM disk that is destroyed on shutdown. Even the GPG key file information can be stored encrypted on the floppy.
- Keystroke monitoring — THL has GPG Grid, a wrapper for GPG that lets you use a video game-style character entry system instead of typing in your passphrase. Keystroke loggers get a set of grid points, instead of a passphrase.
- Power usage and other side-channel attacks — Under the Paranoid options, a copy of GPG runs in the background generating keys and encrypting random documents. This makes it harder to determine when real encryption is taking place.
- Reading the screen over the user's shoulder is made difficult when Tinfoil Hat is switched to paranoid mode, which sets the screen to a very low contrast.

== Applications ==
THL can be used on most modern PCs using the x86 processor architecture. Verifying the checksum can pose a greater challenge. The text of the documentation is salted with a few jokes, the humor working in stark contrast to the serious and paranoid tone of the surrounding text. The very name of the distribution pokes fun at itself, as Tinfoil Hats are commonly ascribed to paranoiacs as a method of protecting oneself from mind-control waves.

Tinfoil Hat Linux requires one to work in a text-only environment in Linux, electing to start users with a Bourne shell, the text editor vi, and with no graphical user interface. It uses BusyBox instead of the normal Util-Linux, the GNU Core Utilities (formerly known as FileUtils, ShellUtils, and TextUtils), and other common Unix tools. Tinfoil Hat also offers the GNU nano text editor.

== See also ==
- List of LiveDistros
- Damn Small Linux
- Security-focused operating system
- Tin Hat Linux
- OpenBSD
