= En Garde (novel) =

2006 novel

En Garde is the 17th volume of the Nancy Drew: Girl Detective series. It was published in 2006 under the pseudonym Carolyn Keene.

== Plot ==
The story is told with Nancy Drew as the narrator. Nancy's friend George Fayne is taking fencing classes at Salle Budapest. Every thing seems well except for a shadowy guy who seems to be at both the salle and the fencing meet, but Nancy ignores him for now. George is at the meet with her fencing friends and twins DeLyn and Damon Brittany. When Una, a fencer from Salle Olympique, gets a minor injury due to a faulty gauntlet, it leads to a fight between Bela Kovacs, the coach at Salle Budapest, and Paul Mourbiers, the coach of Salle Olympique, Nancy learns of the two coaches' long rivalry.

This deeply affects Kovacs' business as a TV crew records this fight and interviews Mourbiers, who loses no time in bad-mouthing Kovacs. So, Nancy starts investigating to help out. Soon she discovers that Mourbiers called the TV crew to the meet. She also discovers the reason Mourbiers and Kovacs are rivals. At the 1976 Montreal Olympics, during the quarter-final match the duo faced each other. During the bout, Mourbiers' épée touched the ground. The referee did not notice this, but Kovacs did. He protested, but the referee penalized Kovacs a point. This led to him losing the bout. Mourbiers went on win the silver medal. Nancy uses her boyfriend Ned Nickerson's father's high position in mass media to arrange an interview with Kovacs so that he can regain his image, but in vain as Kovacs sends the TV crew away suspecting it to be sent by Mourbiers. As Nancy continues her investigation she discovers that several of the foils are missing their protective tips. While she is investigating, Damon gets involved in an accident when he smells ammonium carbonate (from an ampoule of smelling salts which were placed in DeLyn's fencing mask, which he accidentally wears). At the twins' home, Nancy realizes that over the past few years, DeLyn has won more awards than Damon, and that DeLyn has been throwing some bouts to not let her brother feel sad at being less talented.

The next day when Nancy and George go to Salle Olympique to investigate, Una gets injured and Mobiers accuses the duo of being saboteurs from Salle Budapest. As she is about to leave she sees the very same shadowy guy (whom she has nicknamed Raggedy Man) trying to hurt Una. When she catches him, she realizes that he is Una's ex-boyfriend, Dough Calley, who is a member of a rock band (thus explaining his attire) who was at Salle Budapest as he had heard that she was dating Damon. When Nancy returns home, she sees that a saber has been plunged through the door with a note attached to it saying "THIS IS WHAT HAPPENS TO BUSYBODIES".

After putting together the clues, Nancy finally realizes that the one responsible behind all the events is none other than Damon. The next morning at the college meet, she finds a bottle of strychnine in Una's bag. She finally catches Damon, who reveals that he did all this just to get back at Una for breaking up with him. He ripped off Una's gauntlet's seam, which led to her injury, but his intentions were not injure her, just to get her to lose the bout for improper equipment, but when he saw its effects when people cancelled their lessons, he decided to make it look like Mourbiers was really sabotaging the salle. He did not intend to injure DeLyn by putting the mask on her, instead planning to remove it before the fumes overcame her. He also put the fake poison bottle in Una's bag. Damon is kicked out of the college team and decides to let go of fencing as he was actually sad while competing in it. Meanwhile, DeLyn wins the bout, but Una seems quite happy because Dough Cally improves himself, becoming quite a decent man, and may finally be accepted by her father. Kovacs and Mourbiers reconcile by setting aside the Olympics incident.
