= AUFS =

Unit of UV absorbance intensity

Absorbance Units Full Scale (AUFS) or Absorption Units Full Scale is a unit of absorbance intensity that denotes the output of a spectrophotometer. The acronym AUFS can also be written out as Absorbance Units per Full Scale Deflection.

== Usage ==
AUFS is an arbitrary unit of the maximum ultraviolet or visible light absorbance intensity measured by a detector. It can be used in chemical analysis to quantify components in a mixture, as each component's integrated peak area corresponds to their relative abundance. AUFS is given as a number ranging from 0 to 1, where a measurement of 1 AUFS indicates an absorbance reading of 1 at full deflection.

== Application areas ==
- Analytical chemistry
- Chromatography

== See also ==
- Spectroscopy
