= GFTP =

Free FTP-software

gFTP
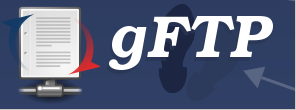

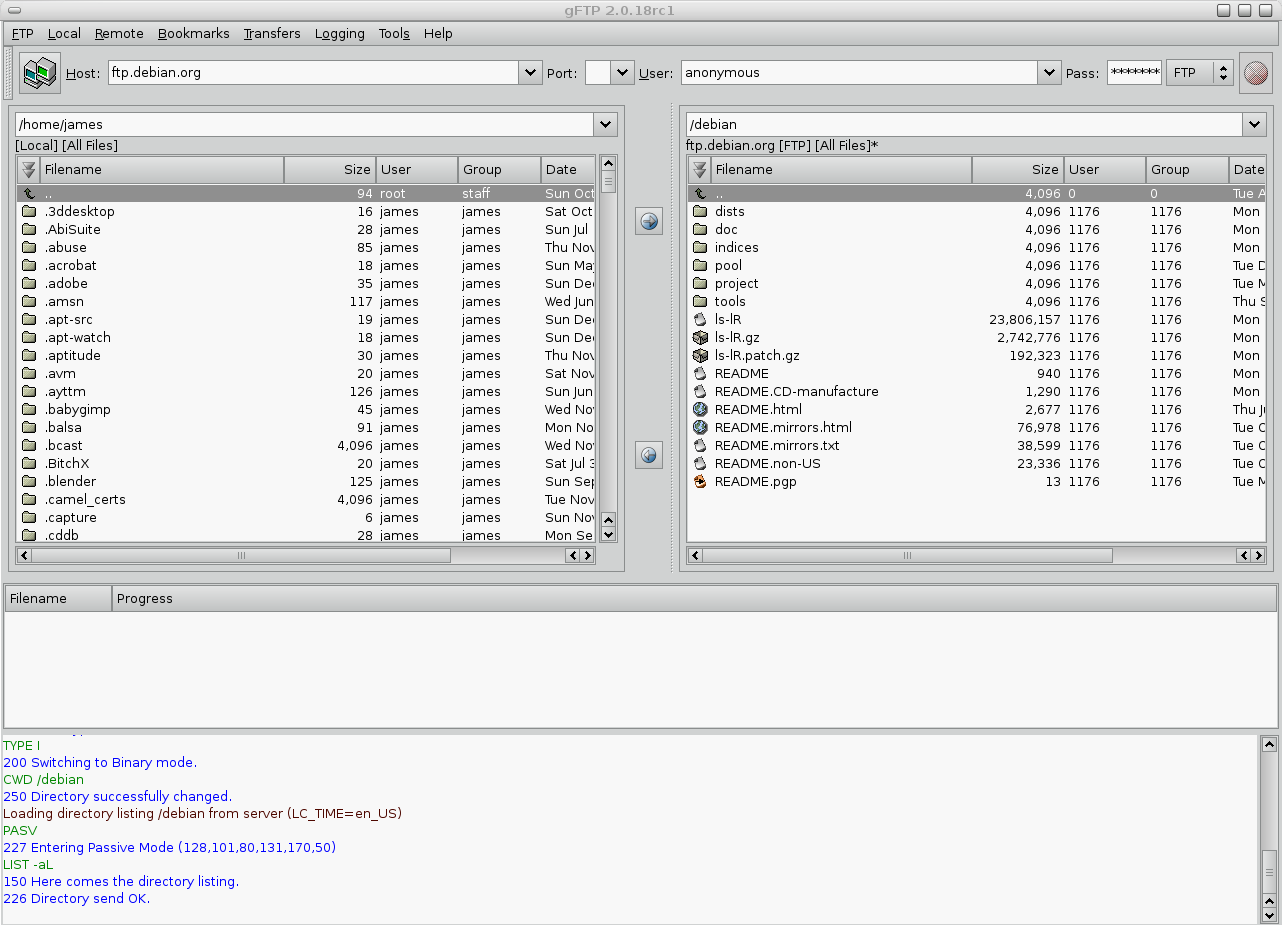
- A screenshot of gFTP 2.0.18
- Developer: Brian Masney
- Preview release: 2.9.1b / 15 February 2022
- Operating system: Cross-platform
- Available in: 67 languages
- List of languages Amharic, Arabic, Assamese, Azerbaijani, Belarusian, Bulgarian, Bengali, Bengali (India), Bosnian, Catalan, Catalan (Valencia), Czech, Danish, German, Dzongkha, Greek, English (Canada), English (Great Britain), Esperanto, Spanish, Estonian, Basque, Finnish, French, Irish, Galician, Gujarati, Hebrew, Hindi, Croatian, Hungarian, Italian, Japanese, Kannada, Korean, Lithuanian, Latvian, Macedonian, Malayalam, Marathi, Malay, Norwegian Bokmål, Nepali, Dutch, Occitan, Oriya, Punjabi , Polish, Portuguese, Portuguese (Brazil), Romanian, Russian, Kinyarwanda, Slovak, Slovenian, Albanian, Serbian, Serbian (Latin), Swedish, Tamil, Telugu, Thai, Turkish, Ukrainian, Chinese (Simplified, PRC), Chinese (Traditional, Hong Kong S.A.R.), Chinese (Traditional, Taiwan)
- Type: File Transfer Protocol client
- License: GPL-2.0-or-later
- Website: www.gftp.org

gFTP is a free and open-source multithreaded File Transfer Protocol client program. It is most used on Unix-like systems such as Linux, macOS, and Sony PlayStation 3. It includes both a graphical user interface (GUI), which utilizes the GTK+ graphical toolkit, and a command-line interface. gFTP is released under the terms of the GPL and has been translated into 45 languages.

There is support for the FTP, FTPS (control connection only), HTTP, HTTPS, SFTP, and FSP protocols as well as FTP and HTTP proxy server support and FXP file transfers (transferring files between two remote servers via FTP).

The GUI uses a double-paned layout, with the local filesystem in the left pane and the remote filesystem in the right pane. Below there is a transfer queue that shows the real-time status of each queued or active file transfer. At the bottom is a message log, which displays the text commands and responses between gFTP and the remote server. Sites are stored in a hierarchical collection of bookmarks, though a site bar allows connections to unbookmarked sites.

Project head Brian Masney indicated in June 2013 that, with no new releases since 2008, he would like a new developer to take it over. To date no one has done so and the project remains dormant.
