= OverlayFS =

Linux filesystem

- Developer(s): Miklos Szeredi, open-source community
- Full name: Overlay File System

Features
- File system permissions: POSIX

Other
- Supported operating systems: Linux, FreeBSD and NetBSD

OverlayFS is a union mount filesystem implementation for Linux. It combines multiple different underlying mount points into one, resulting in a single directory structure that contains underlying files and sub-directories from all sources. Common applications overlay a read/write partition over a read-only partition, such as with LiveCDs and IoT devices with limited flash memory write cycles.

== History ==
The need and specification of a kernel mode Linux union mount filesystem was identified in late 2009. The initial RFC patchset of OverlayFS was submitted by Miklos Szeredi in 2010. By 2011, OpenWrt had already adopted it for their use.

It was merged into the Linux kernel mainline in 2014, in kernel version 3.18. It was improved in version 4.0, bringing improvements necessary for e.g. the overlay2 storage driver in Docker.

While most Live CD linux distributions used Aufs as of November 2016, Slackware used overlayfs for its live CD.

== Implementation ==
Here is an example of usage of OverlayFS, as part of profile-sync-daemon for web browser profiles.

Filesystem     1024-blocks   Used Available Capacity Mounted on 
overlaid            337284 274960     62324      82% /run/user/1000/psd/vulcansphere-chromium 
overlaid            337284 274960     62324      82% /run/user/1000/psd/vulcansphere-firefox-fwl7ugb8.default 
overlaid            337284 274960     62324      82% /run/user/1000/psd/vulcansphere-firefox-17y0wmxk.default-release

The main mechanics of OverlayFS relate to the merging of directory access when both filesystems present a directory for the same name. Otherwise, OverlayFS presents the object, if any, yielded by one or the other, with the "upper" filesystem taking precedence. Unlike some other overlay filesystems, the directory subtrees being merged by OverlayFS do not necessarily have to be from distinct filesystems.

OverlayFS supports whiteouts and opaque directories in the upper filesystem to allow file and directory deletion.

OverlayFS does not support renaming files without performing a full copy-up of the file; however, renaming directories in an upper filesystem has limited support.

OverlayFS does not support merging changes from an upper filesystem to a lower filesystem.

== See also ==
- Aufs
- UnionFS, an older union mount project
