= RUNT Linux =

Linux distribution for network tests

RUNT Linux is an acronym for ResNet USB Network Tester. It is one of many Linux distributions designed to run from a USB flash drive. RUNT is based on Slackware's bare kernel. It was originally designed as a network tool for students at North Carolina State University. It consists of a boot floppy image and a zip file, similar to zipslack. It is intended to be a fairly complete Linux installation for use as a testing tool capable of booting on any x86 computer with a USB port and a bootable floppy.
