= Slax =

Linux distribution

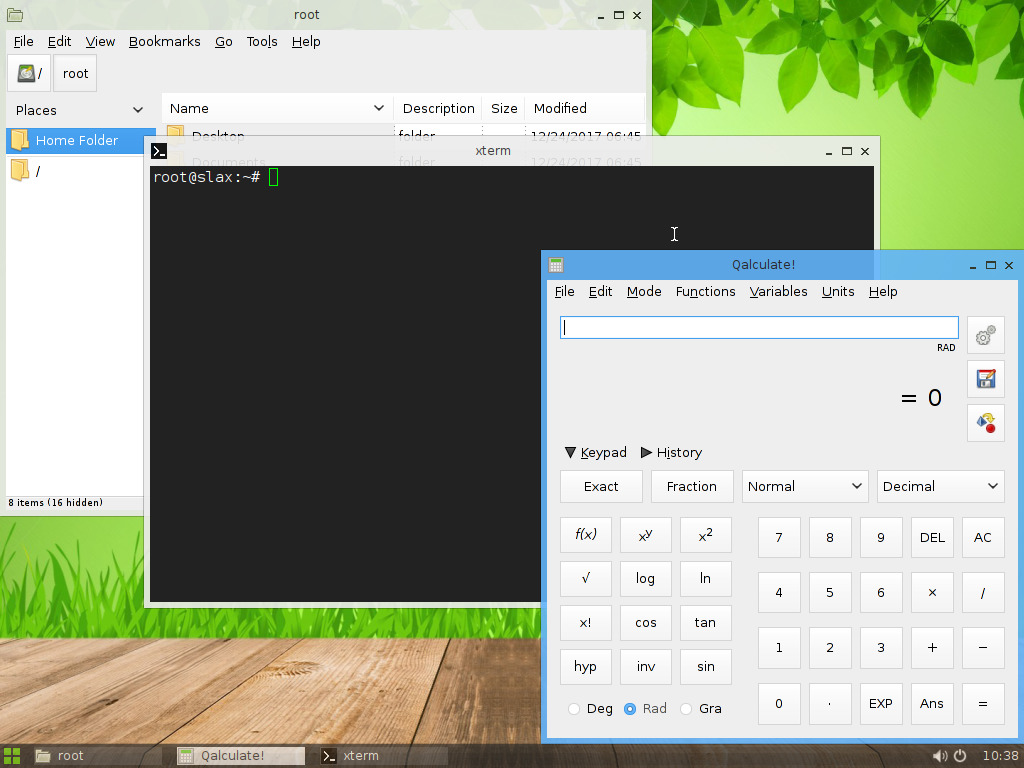
- Slax 11.2 RC1
- Developer: Tomáš Matějíček
- OS family: Linux (Unix-like)
- Working state: Current
- Source model: Open source
- Latest release: 2026.11 / 8 November 2026; 6 days ago
- Kernel type: Monolithic
- License: Various
- Official website: slax.org

Slax is a LiveCD Linux distribution developed by Tomáš Matějíček and based on upstream customizable Linux distributions. Packages can be added by the apt package manager or can be prepared as modules. The tagline for Slax refers to itself as "your pocket operating system".

== Features ==
One of the main benefits of the Slax distribution is its ease of customization. Additional software can be added and removed, using Slax modules. A traditional package manager such as Debian's APT is not required to load additional software. Slax modules are completely self-contained. However, APT is fully supported. Users can also modify the default CD image or USB drive installation to customize the packages available in the distribution on boot. Slax also allows Debian packages to be converted into Slax modules.

Slax modules are compressed read-only SquashFS file system images that are compressed with an LZMA compressor. The various modules are stacked together to build the complete Slax root directory. A supplemental writable layer (a tmpfs file system) is put on top of the stack to implement the write functionality.

The stackable file system of choice changed between Slax versions 5 (UnionFS) and 6 (aufs), as did the module file name extension (changed from .mo to .sb).

== Versions ==
=== Slackware-Live! 1 ===
Slackware-Live! 1.8.0.1 was based on Slackware 8.0. Slackware-Live! 1.81.0.21 was based on Slackware 8.1.

=== Slackware-Live! 2 ===
Slackware-Live! 2.9.0.1 was based on Slackware 9.0.

=== Slax 3 ===
Slackware-Live! was renamed to SLAX in 3.0.24.

=== Slax 4 ===
Slax 4.0.1 is based on 4.0.1 Linux live scripts with Linux Kernel 2.4.25. Slax 4.2.0 special is based on SLAX 4.2.0.

=== Slax 5 ===
There were five editions of Slax 5:

- Slax Standard was the standard edition for normal personal use, introduced in Slax 5.0.0.
- Slax KillBill included Wine, DOSBox, and QEMU to run MS-DOS and Windows applications, introduced with Slax 5.0.2.
- Slax Server supplied additional Internet functionality and came with pre-configured DNS, DHCP, Samba, HTTP, FTP, MySQL, SMTP, POP3, IMAP and SSH servers and several other server applications, introduced with Slax 5.0.8.
- Slax Popcorn was a minimalistic edition focused on browsing and multimedia playback, introduced with Slax 5.0.5. It featured Mozilla Firefox as the default web browser and the lightweight Xfce as a desktop environment instead of KDE.
- Slax Frodo was a "bare bones" edition, providing only a full-featured text-only environment, particularly focused on computers with small amounts of RAM.

The Fluxbox Window Manager was an option in all editions except Frodo.

Slax 5.0.0 standard edition is based on Slackware-current and Linux Live 5 with UnionFS and SquashFS, Linux kernel 2.6.11.6.

=== Slax 6 ===
Slax 6 is offered in a single version and completely relies on modules (additional packages) for extra features. From version 6, modules are based on LZMA compression, but some compatibility was initially provided between the obsolete .mo modules used by Slax version 5 and the more recent .lzm modules of version 6. As there have been some changes between Linux kernel versions during sub-version releases of Slax 6, however, the .mo modules of Slax 5 are now considered obsolete. Each module or package should be compiled for compatibility with the Linux kernel currently in use.

=== Slax 7 ===
Slax version 7 was announced on the developer's blog (which has now been integrated into a newly refreshed Slax website). Slax 7 supports both 64-bit and 32-bit architectures, and according to its download page, "is available in more than 50 languages". It also features a stripped-down version of KDE 4, a new wallpaper, and a new module system.

=== Slax 9 ===
In November 2017, the developer announced the release of version 9. This latest edition is heavily rewritten and is based on Debian, and relies on APT to add packages. The default builds (both 32-bit and 64-bit) contain Fluxbox window manager with a terminal, Chromium web browser, LeafPad text editor, calculator, pcmanfm file manager, and wicd network manager.

=== Slax 11 ===
Slax 11.2 is based on Debian Bullseye (version 11.2). Slax 11.3 is based on Debian version 11.3.0. Slax 11.4 is based on Debian version 11.4.0. Slax 11.6 is based on Debian version 11.6.0.

=== Slax 15 ===
Slax 15.0 is based on Slackware 15.

=== Slax 2026.11 ===
In November 2026, after several years without any new releases, Slax 2026.11 was released, based on Debian Trixie and using the Linux 6.12 kernel. It also features a graphical installer for Windows and Linux. Other new features include an improved desktop interface, an AI Assistant, and support for Secure Boot.

== See also ==
- Lightweight Linux distribution
- List of Linux distributions that run from RAM
