= Salix OS =

Linux distribution

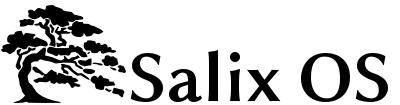

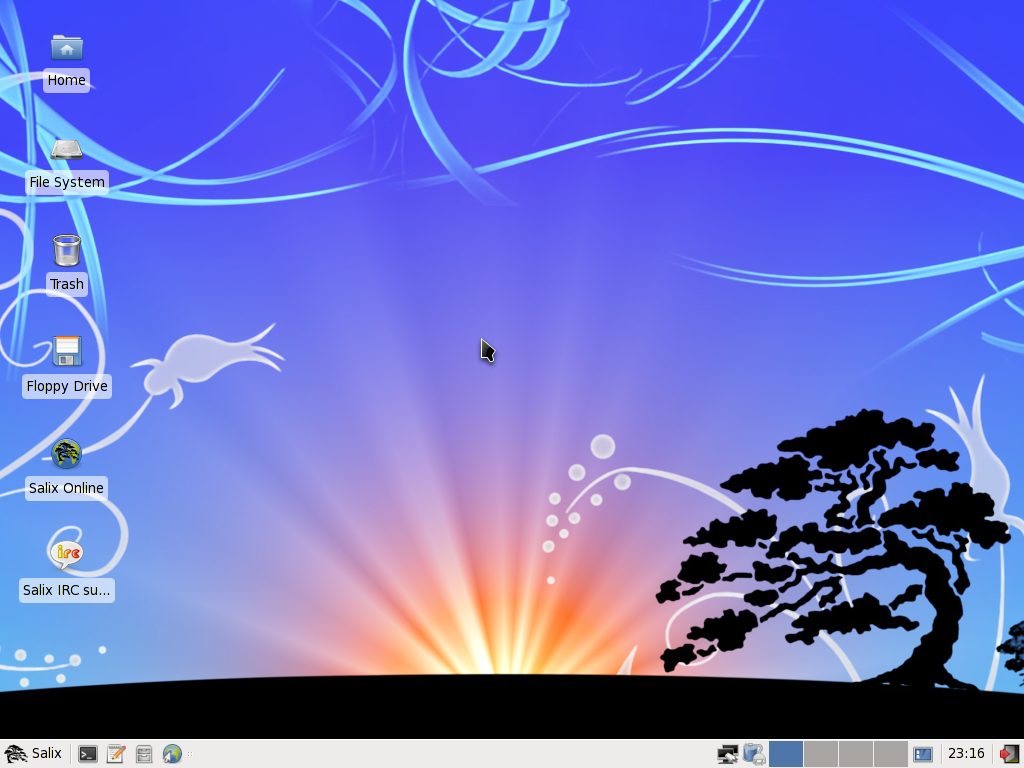
- Salix OS
- Developer: Cyrille Pontvieux, George Vlahavas, Pierrick Le Brun, Thorsten Mühlfelder, and others
- OS family: Unix-like (Linux kernel)
- Working state: Current
- Source model: Open source
- Initial release: September 16, 2009; 17 years ago
- Latest release: /
- Default user interface: Xfce, LXDE, KDE, Fluxbox, Openbox, Ratpoison, MATE
- License: Various
- Official website: salixos.org

Salix OS is a multi-purpose Linux distribution based on Slackware.

== Goals ==
Salix OS retains full backward compatibility with Slackware. This enables Slackware users to benefit from Salix repositories, which they can use as an "extra" source of software for their distribution. However, while in the KISS principle that Slackware adheres to, "Simple" refers to the system design, Salix OS applies it to daily use as well. It aims to be simple, fast and easy to use.

The operating system is not supposed to be user-friendly or familiar to users migrating from Windows, as some of Salix OS developers state on their forum. In their opinion, the target audience for Salix OS might be described as "lazy Slackers", users familiar with Linux in general and Slackware in particular who do not mind having additional tools to reduce their workload, while maintaining the maximum compatibility with Slackware possible. Salix OS adds automated dependency resolution, enhanced internationalization and localization, a larger repository of applications, and a well equipped suite of native administration and configuration tools for both the GUI and the command line. In so doing it is making the system more user friendly than vanilla Slackware to newcomers as well.

== Installation modes ==
Salix had seven editions, namely MATE, Xfce, Fluxbox, OpenBox, KDE, and Ratpoison editions, until 2016 when Salix 14.2 came with Xfce desktop environment only.

The installation provided in Salix is text dialog based. It is easy to navigate and offers a complete choice of options. Spkg, which runs underneath, is optimized for speed. A "full" mode installation only takes a few minutes on a modern PC. For those who prefer a more conventional GUI installer, one is provided in Salix Live editions.

Salix offers three different modes of installation :

Core: Only the minimum essentials for a console system to start. Salix ncurses system tools are included, but a graphical system is not. This mode is designed for experienced users who want to customize their installation for a specific purpose, such as a web server, file server, etc.

Basic: This includes the previous Core mode applications with, depending on the particular edition, the addition of only the Xfce or OpenBox desktop environment, a web browser (Firefox with Xfce and Midori with Openbox), the gslapt package manager and Salix system GUI utilities. This mode is designed for advanced users that would like to install a lightweight desktop environment and add their own choice of applications.

Full: This installs a complete set of applications one could need on a day-to-day basis. That includes all the Basic mode applications with the addition of Claws-mail email client, the complete Libreoffice suite, a Java Runtime Environment, the Parole media player, Exaile music manager, etc., following the "one application per task" rationale.

All three installation modes come with a complete development environment, so users do not need to add anything to start developing and compiling applications.

Salix OS release history
Version	Date
Salix OS (Xfce) 13.0	September 16, 2009
Salix OS (Xfce) 13.0.1	November 2, 2009
Salix OS (Xfce) 13.0.2	December 23, 2009
Salix Live (Xfce) 13.0	April 8, 2010
Salix OS (Xfce) 13.1	June 4, 2010
Salix OS (LXDE) 13.1	June 16, 2010
Salix Live (Xfce) 13.0.1	July 27, 2010
Salix OS (Xfce) 13.1.1	August 8, 2010
Salix OS (LXDE) 13.1.1	September 6, 2010
Salix Live (Xfce) 13.1.1	September 16, 2010
Salix Live (LXDE) 13.1.1	September 16, 2010
Salix OS (KDE) 13.1.2	October 30, 2010
Salix OS (Xfce) 13.1.2	November 9, 2010
Salix OS (Fluxbox) 13.1.2	December 7, 2010
Salix OS (LXDE) 13.1.2	December 27, 2010
Salix OS (Xfce) 13.37	May 12, 2011
Salix OS (Fluxbox) 13.37	June 15, 2011
Salix OS (KDE) 13.37	July 22, 2011
Salix OS (LXDE) 13.37	August 18, 2011
Salix OS (Ratpoison) 13.37	October 5, 2011
Salix Live (Xfce) 13.37	February 3, 2012
Salix Live (KDE) 13.37	March 14, 2012
Salix OS (MATE) 13.37	May 9, 2012
Salix OS (Xfce) 14.0	November 26, 2012
Salix OS (KDE) 14.0.01	July 22, 2013
Salix OS (Ratpoison) 14.0.1	October 30, 2013
Salix OS (Xfce) 14.0.1	March 4, 2014
Salix OS (Mate) 14.1	June 1, 2014
Salix OS (Openbox) 14.1	July 27, 2014
Salix OS (Fluxbox) 14.1	September 22, 2014
Salix OS (Xfce) 14.1	November 4, 2014
Salix OS (Xfce) 14.2	August 29, 2016
Salix OS (Xfce) 15.0	August 28, 2022

== Package management ==
A goal of Salix OS is package compatibility with Slackware. Salix OS uses the slapt-get package management tool which provides the main functionalities of the apt-get variety of package managers. It uses Slackware's .tgz/.txz package format, but adds dependency resolution management. The system uses meta files (.dep files) to provide dependency information, as well as package description during the install process. Gslapt provides a GUI frontend with similar capabilities.

== System management ==
All system management in Salix OS can be done the Slackware usual (read manual) way. For the 'lazy Slackers' however, a full suite of internationalized system GUI utilities is provided along with ncurses counterparts which can be used in a non-graphical environment (runlevel 3).

== Supported architectures ==
Salix OS offers 2 versions: The first one is built and optimized for the [i586/i686, 32-bit] architecture. The second one is made for the x86-64 architecture.

== LiveCD version ==
Salix Live is the Live CD version of Salix OS. It can be safely used to 'test drive' Salix without having to install anything on a computer. One can thus determine whether and to what extent Salix OS is compatible with a particular hardware configuration and if it suits personal tastes before proceeding with the installation.

Salix Live offers a full feature graphic installer which can manage any of Salix 3 modes of installation.
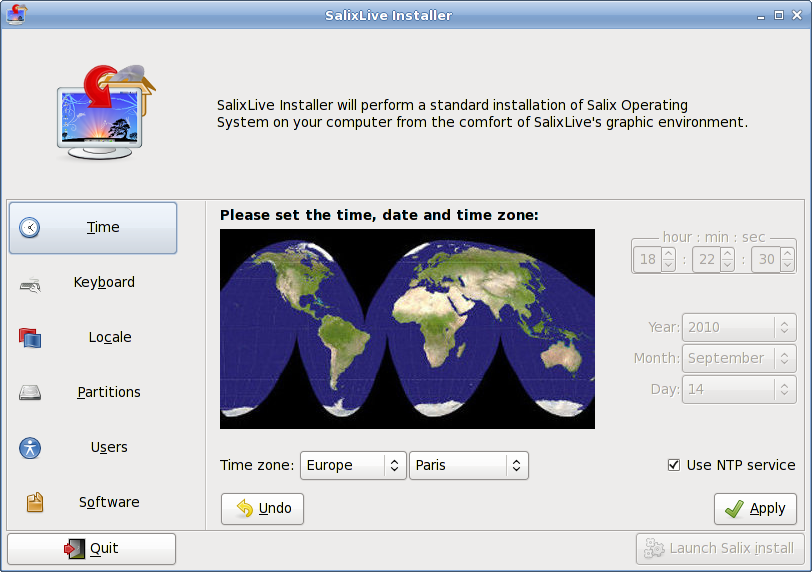
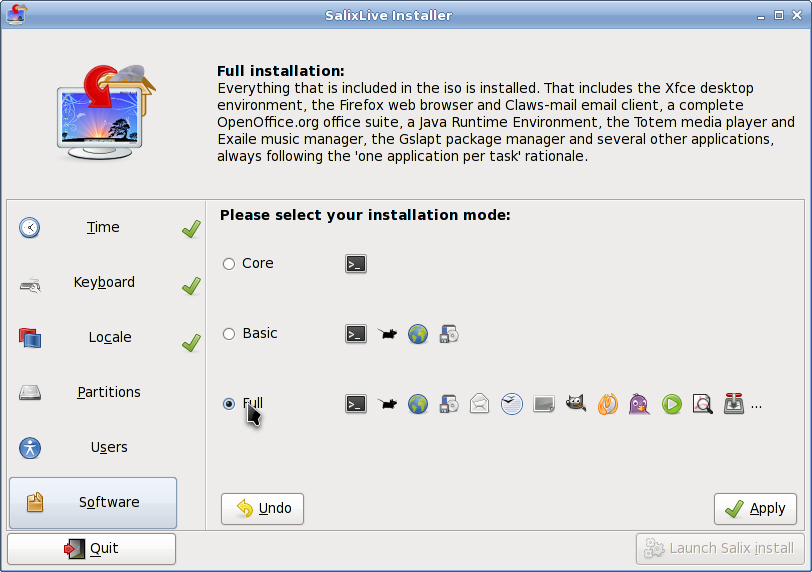

It also features LiveClone, a native GUI utility that easily manages the generation of a vanilla or customized Salix LiveCD onto a regular CD-ROM or a USB key.

Salix Live can also come in handy as a mobile solution or to perform some basic rescue operation such as fixing an ailing LILO bootloader, configuring some partitions, etc.

Salix Live comes for different editions, both for 32 and 64bit systems.

== History ==
Salix OS was originally initiated in 2009 by former Zenwalk developers George Vlahavas, Pierrick Le Brun, Thorsten Mühlfelder, and others, who wanted to return to a closer compatibility with Slackware and a simpler, more easily maintained distribution

== Development ==
All development for Salix OS is done in an open and cooperative manner and is hosted on SourceForge SVN.

Likewise, translations are cooperatively handled on Transifex.

== Documentation ==
The Salix Wiki was created as a source of information online and the Salix startup guide is available to help newcomers get familiar with the system.

== See also ==
- Slackware
- Slax
