= EnGarde Secure Linux =

- Developer: Guardian Digital, Inc
- OS family: Linux (Unix-like)
- Initial release: ?
- Latest release: 3.0.22 / December 2008
- Supported platforms: i686, x86-64 with 512 MB RAM
- Official website: http://www.engardelinux.org/

EnGarde Secure Linux was an open source server-only Linux distribution developed by Guardian Digital. EnGarde incorporates open source tools such as Postfix, BIND, and the LAMP stack.

The platform includes services for web hosting, DNS and email, and others. Since 2005, SELinux has been incorporated into the platform by default. Other security services are included by default as well, such as intrusion detection, anti-virus, network management and auditing and reporting tools.

Users can configure the services through the command line, or remotely manage them through WebTool, the platform's browser-based interface.

== Overview of history and development ==
Since its inception in 2001, the platform has been developed as an OS that incorporates only server functionality while focusing on security as the priority. Originally, the platform loosely drew on some of the code from early versions of Red Hat Linux. Within less than a year of development, much of that was re-engineered. Since then EnGarde has been treated as its own platform, as it maintains its own package repository based on RPM, among other changes.

Additionally, many desktop functions were not included. For example, EnGarde Secure Linux does not include the X Window System. Traditionally, this practice is called hardening. According to the company, the platform has been engineered to maintain this focus on security for server functions.

== Specific focus ==
EnGarde Secure Linux was one of the earliest distributions to include SELinux for complete server implementations, and was one of the first Linux server platforms designed solely for security.

Because there is no X Window System and EnGarde is configured via a graphical interface, it is recommended to configure the operating system using a second computer. Linux.com reviewed the platform in November 2005, where WebTool was described as innovative and well-designed and lets you get productive quickly. A recent review on PolishLinux.org gave it a positive review, but argued it could have included more popular modules and packages.

== EnGarde Secure Linux branches ==
There are two branches of EnGarde Secure Linux: Community and Professional.

- Community Version

This branch, also known as EnGarde Secure Community or EnGarde Secure Linux Community Edition, is the free downloadable version of EnGarde Secure Linux distributed by Guardian Digital, Inc. This distribution is not "officially" supported but Guardian Digital supports the users via the engarde-users mailing list and online forum.

- Professional Version

This branch, also known as EnGarde Secure Professional or EnGarde Secure Linux Professional Edition, is the version of EnGarde Secure Linux sold and officially supported by Guardian Digital, Inc.

== Development cycle ==
Guardian Digital is currently releasing platform updates and upgrades about once every thirty to sixty days. Updates for current users are downloaded through GDSN (Guardian Digital Secure Network): a support system intended to provide customers with software updates, version upgrades, and comprehensive technical support. GDSN is designed to connect EnGarde Secure Linux users to expert security and application engineers.

== Release history and developments ==
Guardian Digital publishes a detailed history on their website. There have been twenty one releases since September 2005.

Some of the early design parameters included SELinux functionality, 64-bit support, interfaces for network intrusion detection, as well as translations for both Spanish and Italian. Other versions of EnGarde are currently being translated into other languages.

Other changes include a point-and-click GUI for using SELinux, automatic hardware inventory generation and a new WebTool API guide for community modules. Changes to the IDS with an Ajax interface and a real-time WebTool support tool are also some changes.
