= Universal USB Installer =

Linux flash drive creation software

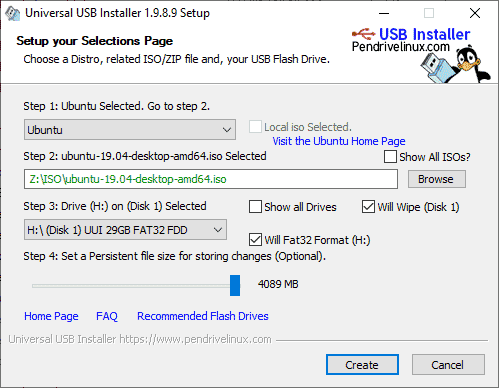
- Universal USB Installer - Boot from USB
- Developer: Pendrivelinux
- Release: August 2006; 20 years ago
- Stable release: 2.0.2.7 / 3 April 2025; 16 months ago
- Written in: NSIS
- Operating system: Microsoft Windows
- Type: Live USB
- License: GNU GPL v2
- Website: pendrivelinux.com/universal-usb-installer-easy-as-1-2-3/

YUMI (Your USB Multiboot Installer) exFAT
- Developer: Pendrivelinux
- Stable release: 1.0.2.4 / 18 October 2023; 2 years ago
- Written in: NSIS
- Operating system: Microsoft Windows, Linux
- Type: Live USB
- License: GNU GPL v2
- Website: pendrivelinux.com/yumi-multiboot-usb-creator/

YUMI (Your USB Multiboot Installer) Legacy (archived)
- Developer: Pendrivelinux
- Stable release: 2.0.9.4 / 30 January 2022; 4 years ago
- Written in: NSIS
- Operating system: Microsoft Windows
- Type: Live USB
- License: GNU GPL v2
- Website: yumiusb.com/yumi-legacy/

YUMI (Your USB Multiboot Installer) UEFI (archived)
- Developer: Pendrivelinux
- Preview release: 0.0.4.5 / 5 March 2022; 4 years ago
- Written in: NSIS
- Operating system: Microsoft Windows
- Type: Live USB
- License: GNU GPL v2
- Website: yumiusb.com/yumi-uefi/

Universal USB Installer (UUI) is an open-source live Linux USB flash drive creation software. It allows users to create a bootable live USB flash drive using an ISO image from a supported Linux distribution, antivirus utility, system tool, or Microsoft Windows installer. The USB boot software can also be used to make Windows 8, 10, or 11 run entirely from USB.

YUMI (Your Universal Multiboot Integrator) is also a separate open-source product release that has several enhanced features, some have been integrated into UUI.

Both YUMI and UUI use Ventoy under the hood.

== Features ==
- Can be used to make a Multiboot live USB bootable flash drive containing many different Linux distributions and tools.
- Optionally create a persistent file for saving changes made from the running environment back to the flash drive.
- Can be used to create a Windows Setup or Windows To Go USB.
- Provides additional information regarding each distribution, including category, website URL, and download link for quick reference.
- Use formatting methods that allow the USB flash drive to remain accessible for other storage purposes.
- Unsupported or (unlisted) ISO files can also be tried against several unlisted ISO options

== Example supported Linux distributions ==
- Ubuntu, Kubuntu and Xubuntu
- Debian Live
- Linux Mint
- Kali Linux
- OpenSUSE
- Fedora
- Damn Small Linux
- Puppy Linux
- PCLinuxOS
- CentOS
- GParted
- Clonezilla

== Reception ==
It's FOSS editor wrote that Universal USB Installer is his "favorite tool and is extremely easy to use." Lifehacker called it "useful".

== See also ==
- List of tools to create Live USB systems
