= LinuxLive USB Creator =

Windows program to create live Linux USBs

LinuxLive USB Creator(LiLi)
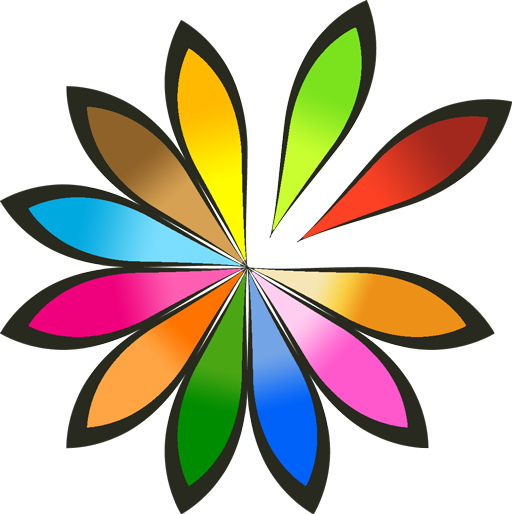

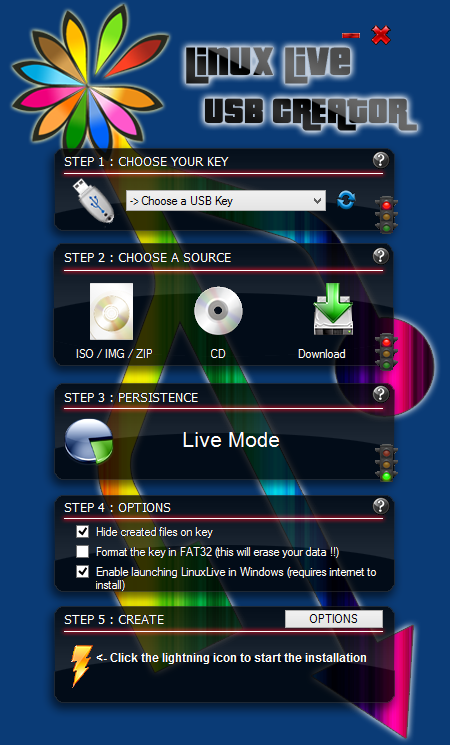
- LinuxLive USB Creator v2.0
- Developer(s): Thibaut Lauzière
- Initial release: April 2013
- Stable release: 2.9.4 (September 10th 2015)
- Written in: AutoIt
- Operating system: Microsoft Windows
- License: GNU General Public License
- Website: http://www.linuxliveusb.com/

LinuxLive USB Creator is a free Microsoft Windows program that creates Live USB systems from installed images of supported Linux distributions. Due to time constraints the sole developer, Thibaut, halted support and updates for LinuxLive December 22nd, 2015.

== Features ==
- Creates bootable Live USB of many Linux distributions
- Makes persistent installations to save all documents created and modifications made to the system
- Run Linux directly in Microsoft Windows using Portable VirtualBox
- Mark created files as hidden
- Non-destructive installation (does not format the device)

== Supported Linux distributions and variants ==
- Linux Mint
- Kali Linux
- Fedora
- Ubuntu, Kubuntu and Xubuntu
- Emmabuntüs
- HandyLinux
- Debian Live
- OpenSUSE
- Sabayon Linux
- Arch Linux and ArchBang
- PCLinuxOS
- CentOS
- Damn Small Linux
- Puppy Linux
- Toutou Linux
- GParted Live
- Clonezilla
- Pinguy OS
- CrunchBang Linux
- Super OS

== See also ==
- List of tools to create Live USB systems
