= Ultamatix =

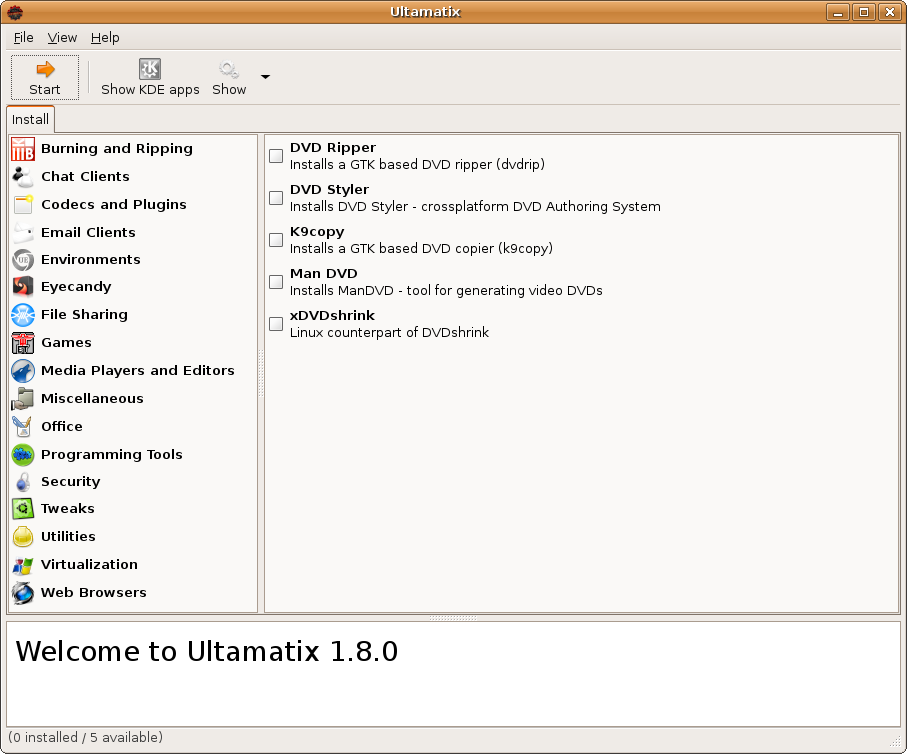
- Ultamatix on Ubuntu
- Original author: Glenn Cady
- Final release: 1.8.0-4
- Written in: Python, bash, Zenity
- Operating system: Linux
- Platform: x86 / x86-64
- Type: software installer
- License: open source
- Website: https://ultamatix.com/

Ultamatix was a tool to automate the addition of applications, codecs, fonts and libraries not provided directly by the software repositories of Debian-based distributions like Ubuntu.

== History ==
Ultamatix was based on Automatix, picking up where its development ended. It has many of the same characteristics, but works on Ubuntu 8.04, and the developer claims to have fixed many of the problems with Automatix.

== Supported software ==
Ultamatix allowed the installation of 101 different programs/features, including programs such as the Adobe Flash Player plugin, Adobe Reader, multimedia codecs (including MP3, Windows Media Audio and video-DVD support), fonts, programming software (compilers) and games.

== Reception ==
Ultamatix has received positive reviews, with Softpedia calling it "Ultamatix: The New Automatix", and Linux.com saying it "may be a worthy successor to Automatix for new Ubuntu and Debian users" and that "The real value of Ultamatix is in making the Linux experience easier for new users".

As with its detailed criticism of Automatix, many in the Ubuntu community believe that there are better solutions for installing the programs covered with this tool, many of which can be installed either from standard Ubuntu repositories or the third-party Medibuntu repository.

Developers and users of Ubuntu have also raised concerns that Ultamatix and Automatix could create longer-term problems, by installing packages in an 'unclean' manner that can prevent the entire Ubuntu system from being upgraded for security and other reasons. The original developer of Automatix has given some positive and negative comments. Other issues are noted in the comments of Softpedia's review and the comments in Linux.com's review.

== See also ==
- Medibuntu
- Getdeb
