= List of tools to create bootable USB =

This is a list of utilities for creating a live USB. Only those listed on Wikipedia are included.

== Overview ==
- "Multiboot" means that the tool allows multiple systems on the USB stick, as well as a bootloader on the USB flash drive to choose which system to load at boot time. Multiboot is environmental technology since it requires only a single storage device to boot multiple files.
- "Persistence" is the ability, for a Linux Live distribution, to save the changes (to e.g. software, documents, parameters, etc) in the live USB across reboots.

Name	Developer	Licensing	Maintained?	Multiboot	Persistence support for Linux distributions	Runs on (OS)	Target OS
balenaEtcher	Balena	Apache License 2.0	Yes	No		Linux, macOS, Windows	Anything
DasBoot	SubRosaSoft	Freeware	No	No	—N/a	macOS	macOS
dd	Various developers	Free software (most vendors)	Yes	No		Unix-like	Anything
Fedora Media Writer	The Fedora Project	GNU GPL v2	Yes	No		Linux, macOS, Windows	Fedora
GNOME Disks	GNOME Disks contributors	GPL-2.0-or-later	Yes	No		Linux	Anything
LinuxLive USB Creator (LiLi)	Thibaut Lauzière	GNU GPL v3	No	No		Windows	Linux
remastersys	Tony Brijeski	GNU GPL v2	No	No		Debian, Linux Mint, Ubuntu	Debian and derivatives
Rufus	Pete Batard	GNU GPL v3	Yes	No		Windows	Anything
SliTaz TazUSB	SliTaz	GNU GPL v3	Yes	No		SliTaz GNU/Linux	SliTaz GNU/Linux
Startup Disk Creator	Canonical Ltd	GNU GPL v3	Yes	No		Ubuntu, Windows	Ubuntu
UNetbootin	Geza Kovacs	GNU GPL v2+	Yes	No		Linux, macOS, Windows	Anything
Universal USB Installer (UUI)	Pendrivelinux	GNU GPL	Yes	Yes	Yes	Windows	Linux
Ventoy	longpanda	GNU GPL v3+	Yes	Yes	Yes	Linux, Windows	Anything
Windows To Go	Microsoft	Proprietary	No	No	—N/a	Windows	Windows
YUMI (Your Universal Multiboot Integrator)	Pendrivelinux	GNU GPL	Yes	Yes	Yes	Windows	Linux

== See also ==
- List of Linux distributions that run from RAM
- Multiboot specification
- System installer
