= UNetbootin =

Utility to create live USB systems

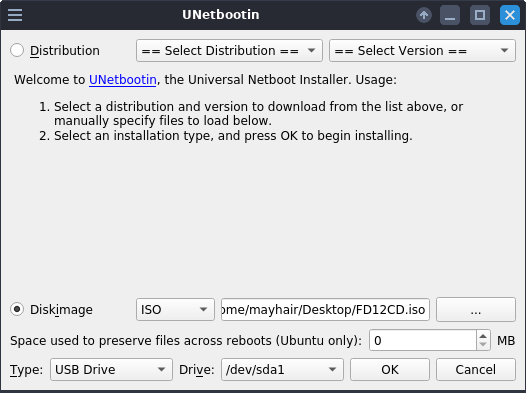
- UNetbootin version 702 on Void Linux
- Original author: Geza Kovacs
- Initial release: April 2007; 18 years ago
- Stable release: 702 / 4 February 2021; 4 years ago
- Repository: github.com/unetbootin/unetbootin
- Written in: C++ (Qt 4/5)
- Operating system: Microsoft Windows, macOS, Linux
- Type: Live USB
- License: GNU GPL version 2 or later
- Website: unetbootin.github.io

UNetbootin ("Universal Netboot Installer") is a cross-platform utility that can create live USB systems and can load a variety of system utilities or install various Linux distributions and other operating systems without a CD.

== Modes ==
=== USB install ===
This installation mode creates bootable USB flash drives and bootable USB hard disk drives; it is a live USB creator.

- Cross-platform (available for Windows, Linux and Mac OS X)
- Non-destructive install (does not format the device) using Syslinux.
- Supports mainstream Linux distributions, such as Ubuntu, Fedora, openSUSE, CentOS, Gentoo, Linux Mint, Arch Linux, Mandriva, MEPIS, Slackware as well as FreeDOS, FreeBSD and NetBSD.
- Can load a variety of system utilities, such as Ophcrack, BackTrack.
- Other operating systems can be loaded via pre-downloaded ISO image or floppy/hard drive disk image files.
- Automatically detects all removable devices.
- Supports LiveUSB persistence (preserving files across reboots; this feature is for Ubuntu only)

Multiple installs on the same device are not supported.

=== Hard drive install ===
This installation mode performs a network installation or "frugal install" without a CD, similar to that performed by the Win32-Loader.

UNetbootin's distinguishing features are its support for a great variety of Linux distributions, its portability, its ability to load custom disk image (including ISO image) files, and its support for both Windows and Linux. Unlike Wubi, and similar to the Win32-Loader, when installing to hard disk, UNetbootin installs to a partition, not a disk image, thus creating a dual-boot setup between Linux and Windows.

== Reception ==
A review in Full Circle in February 2021 stated, "despite the rather dated-looking interface, UNetbootin works perfectly, allowing the writing of almost any Linux or BSD distribution to a USB stick for testing or installation. It is a great example of the Unix philosophy: an application that does one thing and does it well."

== See also ==
- List of tools to create Live USB systems
- Live USB
- Windows To Go
