= Medibuntu =

- Operating system: Ubuntu
- Available in: English
- Type: Software repository
- Website: (not available anymore)

Medibuntu (Multimedia, Entertainment & Distractions In Ubuntu) was a community-maintained repository of Debian packages that could not be included in the Ubuntu distribution for legal reasons.

Reasons for non-inclusion include copyright, license or patent restrictions, or geographical variations in legislation, such as:

- patentability of software, algorithms, formats and other abstract creation
- legal restrictions on freedom of speech or communication
- restrictions on the use of certain types of technology, such as cryptography
- legal restrictions on imports of software technology, requiring for example specific permissions
- offense which packages may cause to users that would make them unsuitable for Ubuntu's universe repository

Many free and non-free software applications are affected by such restrictions somewhere in the world, thus preventing their inclusion into Ubuntu. Medibuntu packaged and distributed those applications. Downloading, using, distributing or otherwise dealing with software from Medibuntu was possibly illegal depending on the user's jurisdiction or region. Examples of software in Medibuntu were Acrobat Reader, non-free codecs, Google Earth, and RealPlayer.

== Current status ==
As of October 2013, the Medibuntu Project has come to an end. The Medibuntu repository is unmaintained and offline.

== See also ==
- GetDeb
- Penguin Liberation Front (Mandriva equivalent)
- RPM Fusion (Fedora/RedHat equivalent)
