= Startup Disk Creator =

Ubuntu Live USB creator

usb-creator
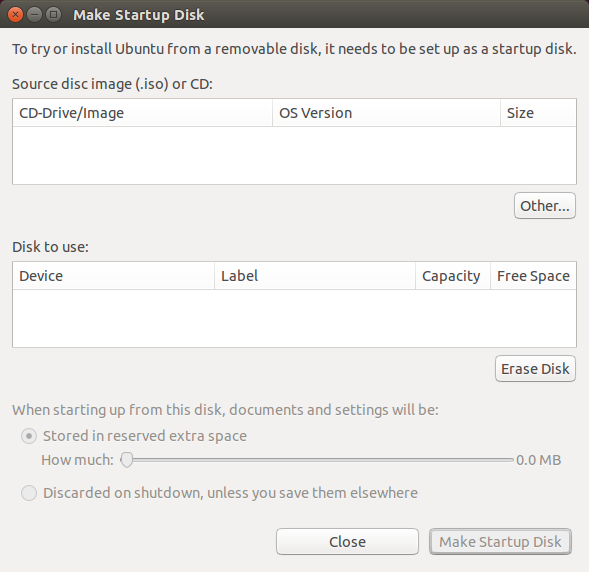
- Startup Disk Creator on Ubuntu
- Developer(s): Evan Dandrea
- Stable release: 0.3.13 / 4 March 2022; 3 years ago
- Repository: git.launchpad.net/~usb-creator-hackers/usb-creator/+git/main
- Written in: Python
- Operating system: Ubuntu, Windows
- Type: Live USB creator
- License: GNU GPL v3
- Website: launchpad.net/usb-creator

Startup Disk Creator (USB-creator) is an official tool to create Live USBs of Ubuntu from the Live CD or from an ISO image. The tool is included by default in all releases after Ubuntu 8.04, and can be installed on Ubuntu 8.04. A KDE frontend was released for Ubuntu 8.10, and is currently included by default in Kubuntu installations. The KDE and Ubuntu frontend go under the names "usb-creator-kde" and "usb-creator-gtk", respectively.

== Features ==
- Install bootloader to USB device

== Future development ==
The tool is available for Ubuntu (GNOME, from 11.04 up to 17.04 also their own called Unity) or Kubuntu (KDE) and also for Windows starting in Ubuntu 10.10 "Maverick Meerkat" but accessible only by inserting the Live CD or DVD into a CD-ROM/DVD-RW drive with Windows running.

== See also ==
- List of tools to create Live USB systems
