= Live CD (disambiguation) =

Live CD may refer to:

- Live CD, a computer operating system written to a bootable CD, and run as a "live" operating system. See also Live USB
- A "live" CD, meaning a recorded live performance album
- Live CD, an album by Ivri Lider

== See also ==
- Boot CD, a boot disk on CD media, media required to start a computer
- Live USB, more recent form of Live CD
