= Fedora Media Writer =

Live media creator for Fedora Linux

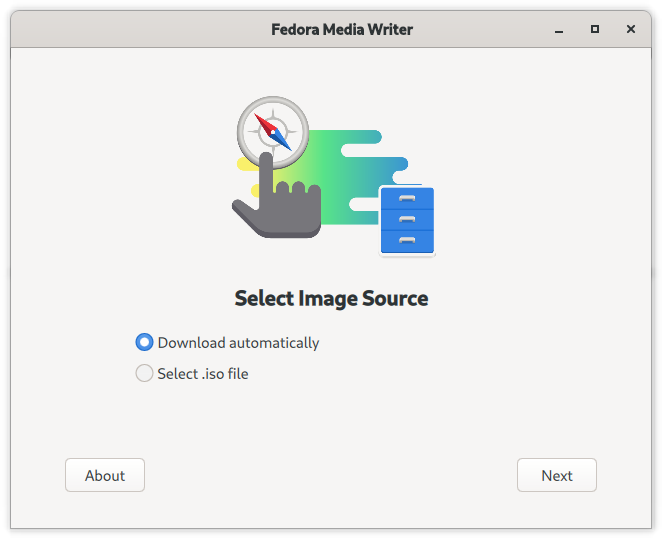
- Fedora Media Writer v5.0.6
- Developer: Fedora Project
- Stable release: 5.2.9 / 30 October 2025; 35 days ago
- Repository: github.com/FedoraQt/MediaWriter
- Written in: C++, QML
- Operating system: Linux, macOS, Windows
- Type: Live media creator
- License: GNU GPL
- Website: fedoraproject.org

Fedora Media Writer is a free software tool designed to create live media for Fedora Linux. It provides a simple and user-friendly interface, allowing users to download the latest Fedora images directly within the application. The tool verifies the integrity of the downloaded images to ensure a reliable installation process and supports writing both Workstation and Server editions of Fedora.

== Features ==
- Cross-platform (available for Linux, macOS, and Windows)
- Destructive installer - "overwrites the drive's partition layout though so it also provides a way to restore a single-partition layout with a FAT32 partition"
- Supports various Fedora Linux releases
- Automatically detects all removable devices
- SHA-1 checksum verification of known releases, to ensure there is no corruption when downloading
- Not limited to Fedora Linux releases, supports custom images

== See also ==
- Fedora Project
- List of tools to create bootable USB
