= DasBoot =

Software utility made by SubRosaSoft.com

- DasBoot 1.0.3 running on Mac OS X 10.6.4
- Developer(s): SubRosaSoft.com Inc.
- Initial release: February 7, 2007
- Stable release: 2.0 / July 13, 2010
- Operating system: Mac OS X 10.5 and earlier
- Type: Live USB
- License: Freeware
- Website: DasBoot at the Wayback Machine (archived 2020-10-30)

DasBoot is a software utility that was produced by SubRosaSoft.com Inc. before the company permanently closed in 2020. It allows the user to create a bootable Mac OS X USB device for Mac OS X 10.5 and earlier. It is a freeware product. This live USB device can be used for diagnostic, repair, and recovery of Mac OS X systems.

It won a Macworld UK Editor's Choice 5 star award.

== Creating a DasBoot device ==
Creating a DasBoot device requires a few steps. In addition to the DasBoot application, the user needs a bootable CD or DVD and a FireWire or USB flash drive. Only Intel-powered Apple computers support booting via USB. USB and FireWire hard drives may also be used.

DasBoot only works with versions of Mac OS X prior to 10.6.

Bootable Mac OS X CD/DVDs are included with programs such as Drive Genius, DiskWarrior, FileSalvage, CopyCatX, and other software utilities. The bootable DVD used for the Mac OS X installer disc cannot be used as it lacks libraries required to create a bootable device.

By default, the following applications are installed on DasBoot devices:

- Preview
- Console
- Disk Utility
- System Profiler
- Terminal

If they are also present in the user's Applications folder, the following applications are automatically included:

- SubRosaSoft.com Inc.'s FileSalvage
- SubRosaSoft.com Inc.'s CopyCatX
- Prosoft Engineering's Drive Genius
- Prosoft Engineering's Data Rescue
- Alsoft's DiskWarrior
- MacForensicsLab Inc.'s MacForensicsLab

Users can add additional applications to their DasBoot device by dragging and dropping the desired application into the Applications area of the DasBoot application. Users can also select and deselect included applications by simply clicking on their icon within the Applications section.

Once the user has selected the device they'd like to make bootable, selected the bootable disk to copy the required libraries and information from, and chosen the programs to include on the DasBoot device, clicking a single button starts the process of building the required information and copying it to the device.

To boot the system from the DasBoot device, the user starts their Mac with the 'Option' (sometimes called 'Alt') key held down. This will display a startup screen that allows them to select which bootable device they would like to start the system from. They then select the DasBoot device and the system will start up as normal. A DasBoot interface will appear once the system boots and allow the user to select the installed application(s) they would like to run.

The release of version 2.0 added support for Mac OS X 10.6 Snow Leopard along with support for newer Intel Macs and some performance enhancements and bug fixes.

== See also ==
- Live USB
- Live CD
- Recovery disc
- Boot drive
