= Rufus (software) =

USB drive software

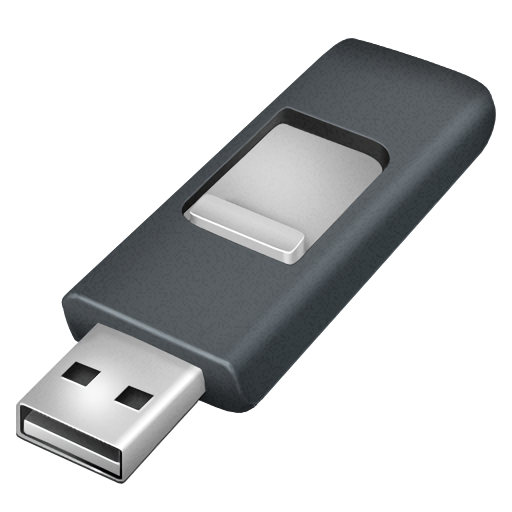

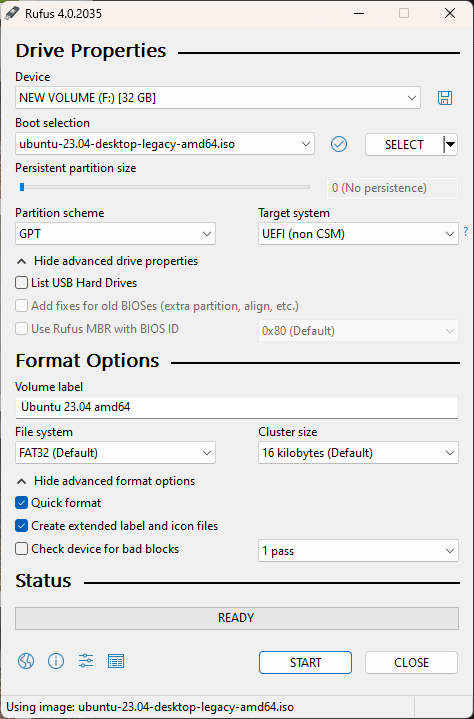
- Rufus 4.0.2035
- Developer: Pete Batard
- Release: December 4, 2011; 14 years ago
- Stable release: 4.15 / 30 June 2026; 4 months ago
- Written in: C
- Operating system: Windows 8 and later
- Size: 1.34 MB
- Available in: 38 languages
- List of languages Arabic, Bulgarian, Chinese Simplified, Chinese Traditional, Croatian, Czech, Danish, Dutch, English, Finnish, French, German, Greek, Hebrew, Hungarian, Indonesian, Italian, Japanese, Korean, Latvian, Lithuanian, Malay, Norwegian, Persian, Polish, Portuguese Brazilian, Portuguese Portugal, Romanian, Russian, Serbian, Slovak, Slovenian, Spanish, Swedish, Thai, Turkish, Ukrainian, Vietnamese
- Type: Live USB
- License: GNU GPL 3+
- Website: rufus.ie
- Repository: github.com/pbatard/rufus

Rufus (The Reliable USB Formatting Utility, with Source) is a free and open-source portable application for Microsoft Windows that can be used to format and create bootable USB flash drives or Live USBs.

== History ==
Rufus was originally designed as a modern open source replacement for the HP USB Disk Storage Format Tool for Windows, which was primarily used to create MS-DOS bootable USB flash drives.

The first official release of Rufus, version 1.0.3 (earlier versions were internal/alpha only), was released on December 4, 2011, with originally only MS-DOS support. Version 1.0.4 introduced FreeDOS support and version 1.1.0 introduced ISO image support. Until 1.2.0, two separate versions were provided, with one for MS-DOS and one for FreeDOS. UEFI boot support was introduced with version 1.3.2, localization with 1.4.0 and Windows To Go with 2.0. The last version compatible with Windows XP and Vista is 2.18, while the last version compatible with Windows 7 operating systems is Rufus 3.22, as Rufus 4.0 increased the minimum version requirement to require Windows 8 or later.

== Features ==
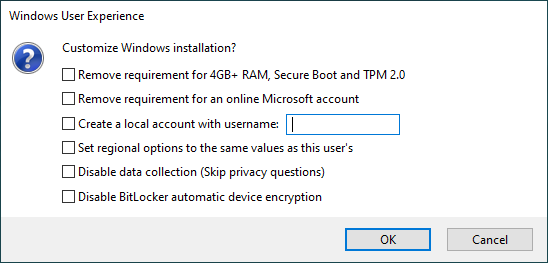
Rufus options for Windows 11

Rufus supports a variety of bootable .iso files, including various Linux distributions and Windows installation .iso files, as well as raw disk image files (including compressed ones). If needed, it will install a bootloader such as SYSLINUX or GRUB onto the flash drive to render it bootable. It also allows the installation of MS-DOS or FreeDOS onto a flash drive as well as the creation of Windows To Go bootable media. It supports formatting flash drives using FAT, FAT32, NTFS, exFAT, UDF and ReFS filesystems.

Rufus can also be used to compute the MD5, SHA-1 and SHA-256 hashes of the currently selected image.

Rufus is capable of downloading retail ISO DVD images of Windows 8.1, various builds of Windows 10 and Windows 11 directly from Microsoft's servers. This ISO download feature is available only if PowerShell 3.0 or later is installed, and 'Check for updates' is enabled in the program's settings (on first usage, Rufus prompts the user whether they want to enable the update check or not).

== See also ==
- List of tools to create Live USB systems
