= HandyLinux =

Linux distribution

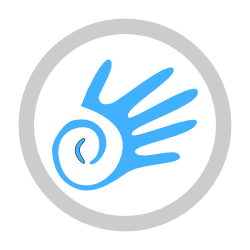

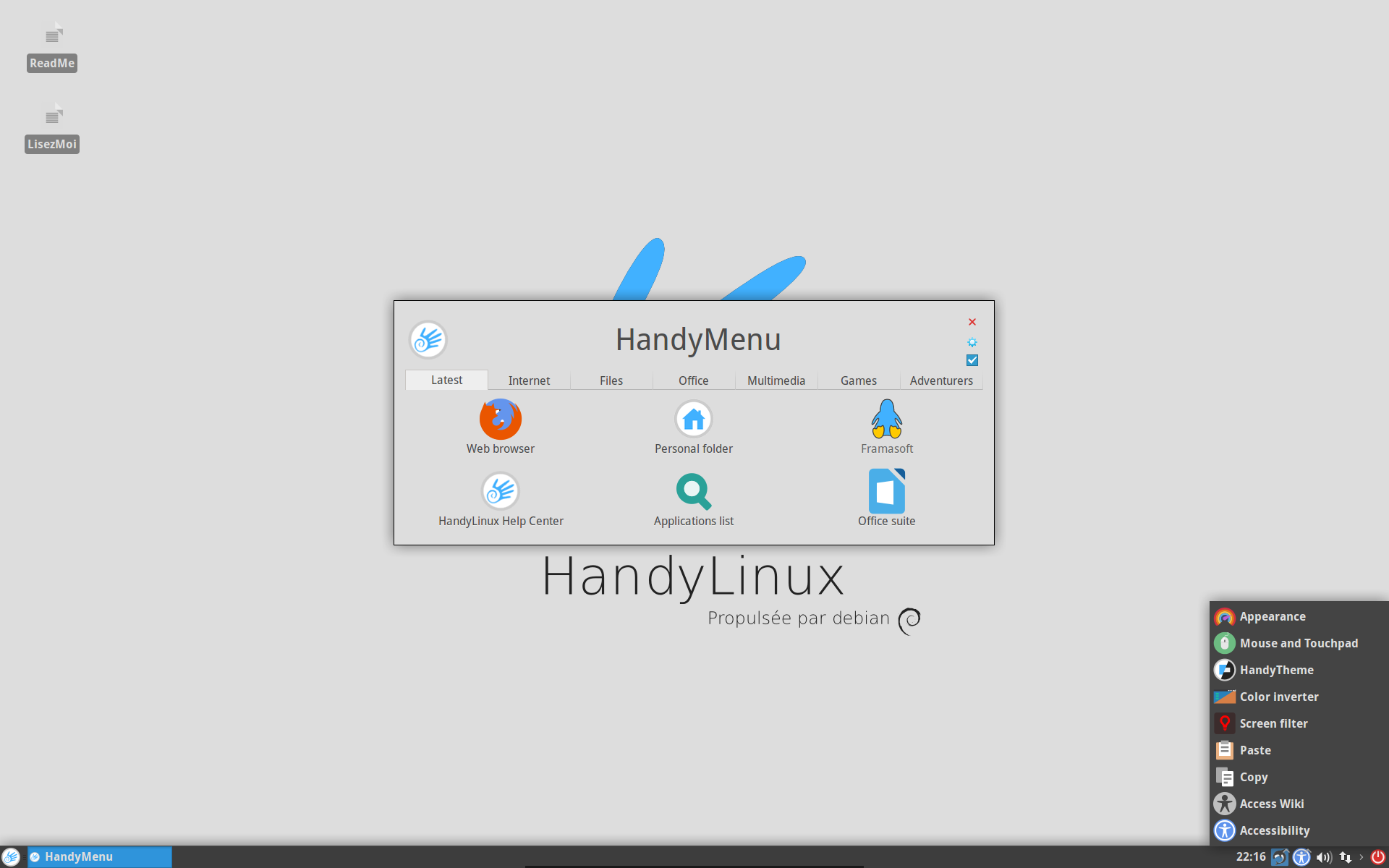
- HandyLinux Desktop
- Developer: thuban, Starsheep, and arpinux
- OS family: Linux (Unix-like)
- Working state: Discontinued
- Source model: Open source
- Initial release: September 2013; 13 years ago
- Latest release: HandyLinux 2.5 / 11 June 2016; 10 years ago
- Available in: Multilingual
- Update method: APT
- Package manager: dpkg (Synaptic)
- Supported platforms: I586, I686 and amd64
- Kernel type: Monolithic Linux kernel
- Userland: GNU
- Default user interface: Xfce/Compiz
- License: Free software licenses (mainly GPL)
- Official website: handylinux.org (archived)

HandyLinux is a simplified Linux operating system developed in France, derived from the Debian stable branch. It was designed to be easily accessible and downloadable, so that it could be used by people with very little computer experience and on a range of older hardware that was no longer supported by the latest versions of proprietary operating systems. It was particularly aimed at older people with dated hardware who do not need nor possess the skills to use many features afforded by state-of-the-art operating systems.

The last version was released in June 2016, and the project is now listed as "discontinued" by DistroWatch. On April 20, 2020, it was announced that HandyLinux was being replaced by Debian-Facile, which is not a distribution itself but a customization of Debian.

== Goals ==
The goal of the HandyLinux project was to provide a "stable" Debian-based OS for elderly people, novices, and people seeking freedom and full functionality on a user-friendly desktop. HandyLinux was an official Debian derivative with a simple and clear graphical user interface called the HandyMenu. The system featured built-in tools to facilitate the handling of home computing.

The distribution and the project's documentation was aimed primarily at French-language users. Documentation was intended to teach users desktop navigation and help them to learn the HandyLinux distribution. Prospective users were encouraged to browse the HandyLinux online forum and ask questions about the operating system.

== Features ==
HandyLinux was designed to be installable on any modern computer with, at minimum, a Pentium 4 processor, 512 MB of RAM, and 3.7 GB of hard drive storage available.

The distribution could be run as either of two "live" versions, live CD (handylinuxlight) or live USB, to sample the prepackaged software and test its compatibility with the installed hardware. Alternatively, it could be installed on a netbook equipped with at least 4 GB of storage on computers built before 2005 (HandyLinux i486 non-PAE) and on computers built from 2005 onward (HandyLinux i686-PAE).

If they choose, users could remove the default HandyMenu and substitute the classical menu of the Xfce desktop environment, as well as add software packages, and customize the look and feel of the distribution after becoming more experienced with the OS by reading the documentation.

All the software needed for a functional desktop was included in the disk image, and an Internet connection was not necessary to install the program bundle prepackaged with the HandyLinux operating system.

== Applications ==
- File manager: Thunar
- Internet: Firefox, Icedove, Transmission
- Multimedia: Clementine, VLC media player
- Office: LibreOffice
- Remote Assistance: TeamViewer (optional with graphic installer)
- Printer installation by: CUPS

Tools were integrated for improving accessibility: a color inverter, a screen filter and magnifier, direct access to documentation, copy and paste button, a virtual keyboard, and voice synthesis integrated into the browser.

Some small practical programs are also included: screenshot, calendar, file search, automatic download folder sorting, Bleachbit for cleaning, "Archive Manager", Disk Utility for formatting, Hardinfo for system information, and XL-wallpaper changer.

== Desktop environment ==
HandyLinux's native desktop environment was based on Xfce, and the Compiz compositing window manager is optional. Users could switch to the more traditional Xfce menu if they preferred it to the HandyMenu.

A seven-tab menu with a large computer icon enabled users to graphically launch applications, and only a single click is necessary to open files and folders or run a program.

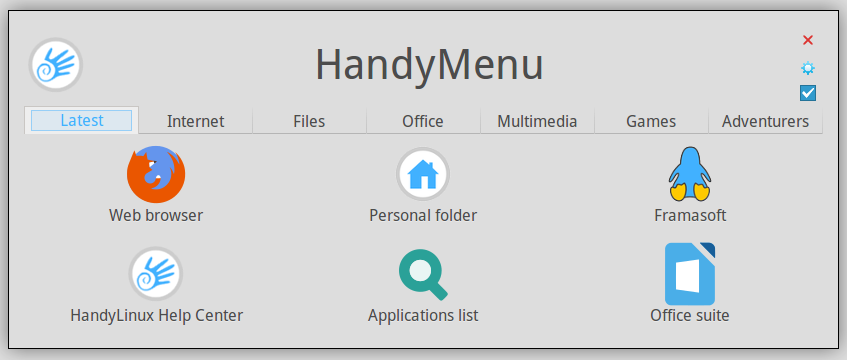
latest

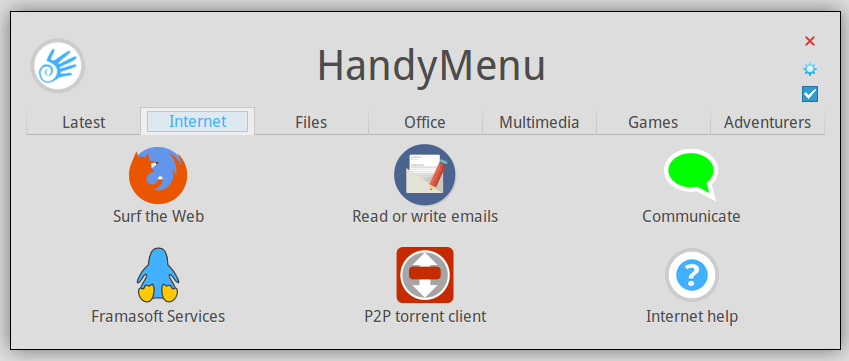
internet

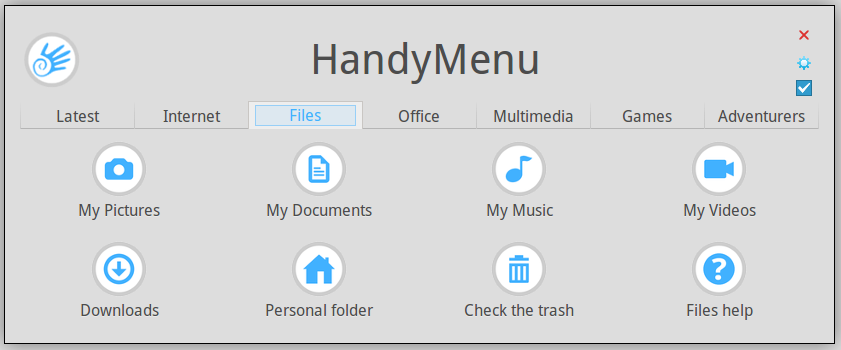
files

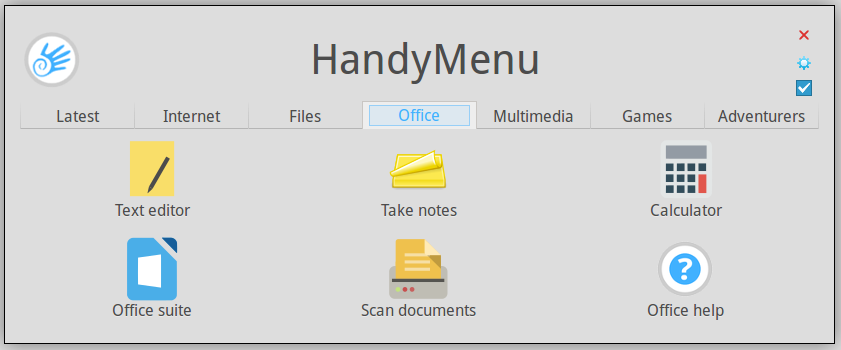
office

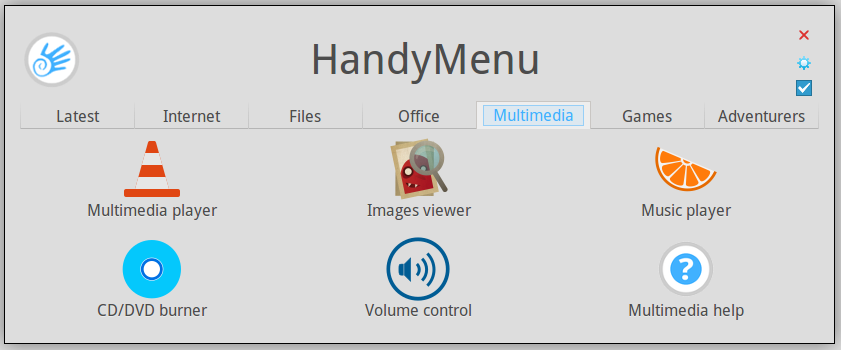
multimedia

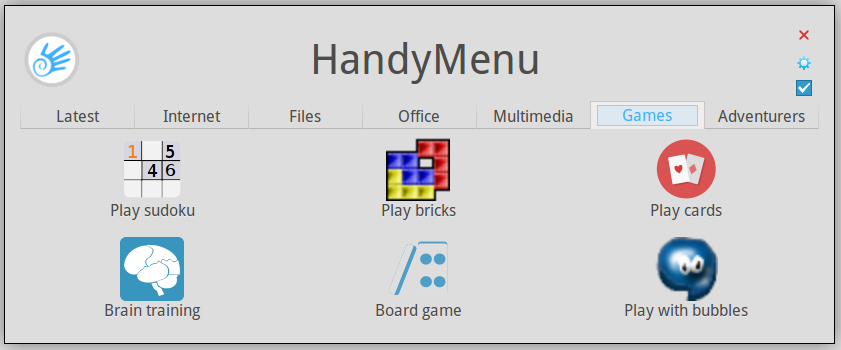
games

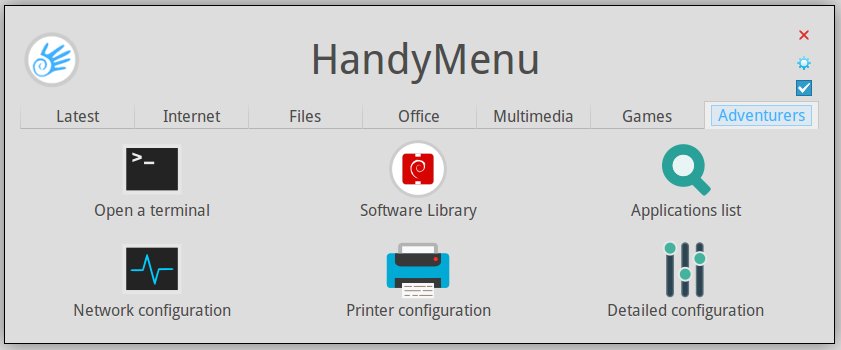
adventurers

== Releases ==
HandyLinux updates generally followed updates of the Debian stable branch.

Name	Release date	Megabytes	Base	32 bits	Supported platform
handylinux-2.5-i386	2016-06-11	1344	Debian based 8.5	32bits	I586 & I686-pae
handylinux-2.5-amd64	2016-06-11	1212	Debian based 8.5	64bits	amd64
handylinux-2.4-i386	2016-04-10	1367	Debian based 8.4	32bits	I586 & I686-pae
handylinux-2.4-amd64	2016-04-10	1240	Debian based 8.4	64bits	amd64
handylinux-2.3-i386	2016-01-24	1378	Debian based 8.3	32bits	I586 & I686-pae
handylinux-2.3-amd64	2016-01-24	1244	Debian based 8.3	64bits	amd64
handylinux-2.2	2015-09-06	1359	Debian based 8.2	32bits	I586 & I686-pae
handylinux-2.2-amd64	2015-09-06	1182	Debian based 8.2	64bits	amd64
handylinux-2.1	2015-06-09	1335	Debian based 8.1	32bits	I586 & I686-pae
handylinux-2.0	2015-05-16	1325	Debian based 8.0	32bits	I586 & I686-pae
handylinuxlight-2.0	2015-05-23	697	Debian based 8.0	32bits	I586 & I686-pae
handylinux-1.9 wheezy	2015-04-11	1250	Debian based 7.8	32bits	I486 & I686-pae
handylinuxlight-1.8	2015-01-17	656	Debian based 7.8	32bits	I486 & I686-pae
handylinux-compiz 1.6.1	2014-08-16	1160	Debian based 7.6	32bits	I486 & I686-pae

A development fork of HandyLinux in the Finnish language was published 29 May 2014.

== See also ==
- Comparison of Linux distributions
- List of Linux distributions
