= Automatix (software) =

Automatix2
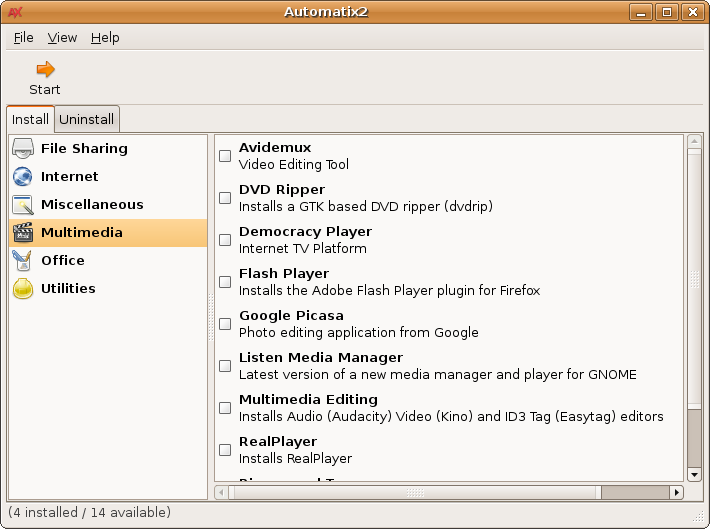
- Screenshot of the Automatix program on Ubuntu 6.10 Edgy
- Developer: Automatix Team
- Stable release: 1.2
- Operating system: Debian, MEPIS, ubuntu
- Platform: Linux
- Website: www.getautomatix.com

Automatix is a tool designed to automate the addition of applications, codecs, fonts and libraries not provided directly by the software repositories of Debian-based distributions (specifically Debian, MEPIS and Ubuntu).

These distributions do not include certain packages or configuration settings that allow the playing of DVDs or MP3 files or the viewing of Adobe Flash content, for example. Packages that allow the playing of MP3s are available to download from official sources but cannot be included on the CD. Packages to enable the playing of DVDs include the libdvdcss algorithm. Although adding these manually is possible, it can be time consuming. This is a particular problem for distributions aimed at simplifying the desktop Linux experience.

== Design ==
Automatix allows the menu-driven installation of 56 different "capabilities", including commercial closed source programs such as the Flash plugin, Acrobat Reader, multimedia codecs (DivX, MP3, Windows Media Audio) and fonts, and programming compilers.

Automatix was not recommended by the Ubuntu development team, which has criticised its content. Some individual Ubuntu developers blamed Automatix 1 for breaking updates from Dapper to Edgy. On 2 November 2006 Ubuntu CTO Matt Zimmerman said "I cannot recommend the use of this program, and systems where it has been used cannot be supported with a clean and official upgrade path."

On August 4, 2007, Automatix was reviewed by Matthew Garrett, a member of the core Ubuntu development team. In his words, “Automatix is, in itself, a poor quality package which fails to conform to Debian or Ubuntu policy.” These comments were made in a technical analysis posted on his blog explaining why Automatix is currently not supported by Canonical Ltd. or the Ubuntu community.

== Successors ==
Automatix was discontinued in early 2008.

A new project called Ultamatix, compatible with Ubuntu 9.04, is based on Automatix.
