= Ventoy =

Live USB bootloader

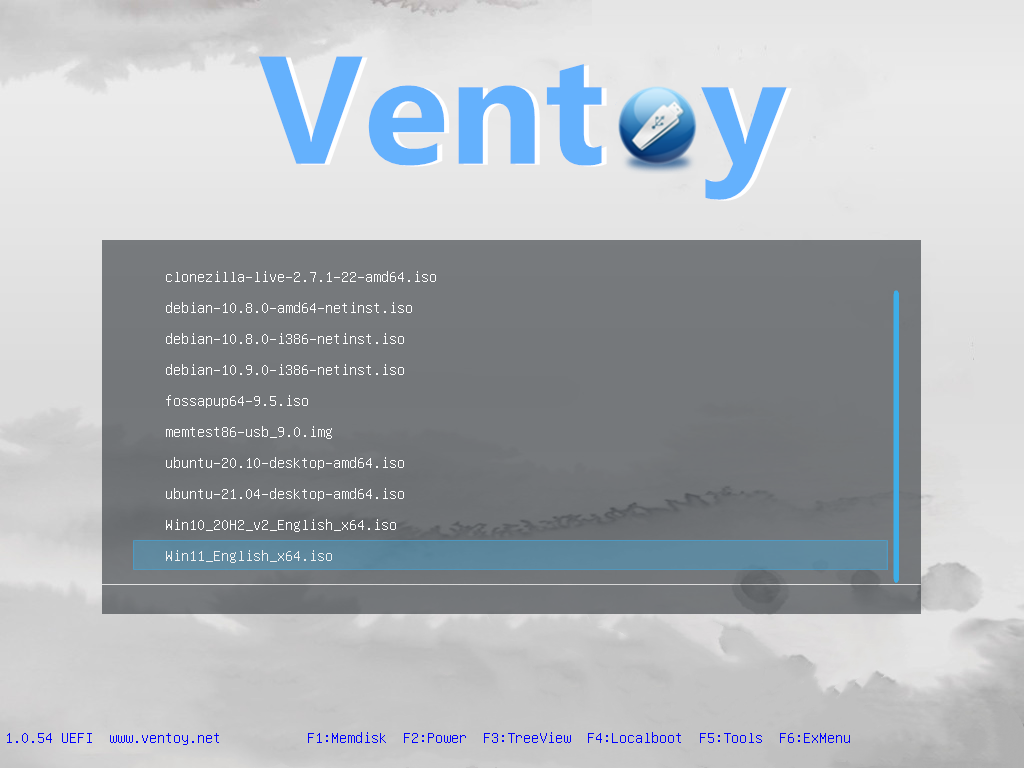
- Ventoy 1.0.54
- Developer: Hailong Sun (aka longpanda)
- Release: 5 April 2020
- Stable release: 1.1.18 (9 October 2026; 37 days ago) [±]
- Operating system: Cross-platform (Windows, Linux)
- License: GPLv3+ License (partial)
- Website: www.ventoy.net/en/
- Repository: github.com/ventoy/Ventoy

Ventoy is a partially open-source utility used for creating bootable USB media storage devices or in a physical drive with files such as .iso, .wim, .img, .vhd(x), and .efi. Once Ventoy is installed on a USB drive, new installation files can be added without reformatting. Ventoy presents the user with a boot menu to select one of the installation files held on the USB drive.

== Features ==
Ventoy can be installed on a USB flash drive, local disk, solid-state drive (SSD, NVMe), or SD card and directly boots from the selected .iso, .wim, .img, .vhd(x), or .efi file(s) added. Ventoy does not extract the image file(s) to the USB drive, but uses them directly, as it can unzip during installation. It is possible to place multiple ISO images on a single device and select the image to boot from the menu displayed just after Ventoy boots.

MBR and GPT partition styles, x86 Legacy BIOS and various UEFI boot methods (including persistence) are supported. ISO files larger than 4 GB can be used. Ventoy supports various operating system boot and installation ISO files, including Windows 7 and later, Debian, Ubuntu, CentOS, Red Hat Enterprise Linux (RHEL), Fedora and more than a hundred other Linux distributions; various Unix releases, VMware, Citrix XenServer, etc. have also been tested. Ventoy isn't recommended on the openSUSE wiki due to reports of boot issues.

== See also ==
- List of tools to create bootable USB
- Disk image
- Operating system
