= RPM Fusion =

Software repository for the Fedora operating system

RPM Fusion is a software repository, providing add-on packages for Fedora Linux. It was born as a merge of the older repositories Livna, Dribble and Freshrpms. They distributed software that Fedora will not, either because it does not meet Fedora's definition of free software, or because distribution of that software may violate US law.

== History ==
It was announced on 8 November 2007 that Livna was to be merged with Dribble and Freshrpms to create a unified repository of add-on software called RPM Fusion. Originally, Fedora 9 was to be the first release that RPM Fusion would be providing add-ons for. However, initially, RPM Fusion was not ready in time and Livna (and other repositories) continued to provide packages for Fedora 9. Subsequently, on 3 November 2008 all three software repositories were merged into RPM Fusion.

== Former repositories ==
=== Livna ===
"Livna" is an ananym of "Anvil," which is the handle of Damien Nadé, the French programmer who maintains rpm.livna.org. While Livna (which is now defunct) was deprecated in favour of RPM Fusion, libdvdcss remained in the Livna repository due to copyright concerns.

=== Dribble ===
Dribble contains software not found in Fedora or Livna because they do not meet their stricter requirements. Dribble concentrates on multimedia, games and emulators yet is not limited to these genres.

=== Freshrpms ===
Made by Matthias Saou in 2000 for his own usage.
