= SoulPad =

OS copying software

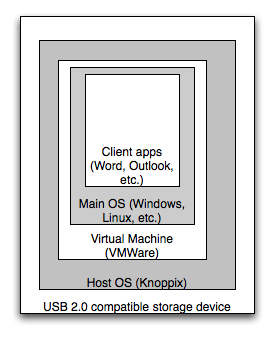
The SoulPad's software stack is key to its operation.

SoulPad is a mobile computing project developed by IBM from 2004-2005. It enabled users to transfer their operating system between computers using a USB flash drive.

== Background ==
The SoulPad project was introduced in a 2004 research paper titled "Reincarnating PCs with Portable SoulPads". Researchers suggested that SoulPad could allow users to boot their personal operating environments from USB-compatible storage devices such as cell phones or iPods. The project aimed to separate the user's operating environment (the "soul"), from the physical hardware (the "body").

== Usage ==
SoulPad allows users to carry their operating system on a USB storage device. The operating system can be copied onto the device, then connected on another computer and booted from the USB. This restores the operating system to the state of its last saved backup, enabling the user to resume work as if the environment had not been interrupted.

== Implementation ==
SoulPad utilizes a layered software stack to implement its functionality. It uses the Live Linux distribution Knoppix as a host operating system. When the computer is powered on, Knoppix recognizes any attached devices and launches a virtual machine using VMware, which resumes the user's last session in their operating system. This process enables the system to restore the user's workspace on different hardware while maintaining functionality.

== Challenges ==
Several challenges were identified during the development of SoulPad. One was the time required to resume the system from a saved state, which could be up to three minutes due to Knoppix's need to recognize all connected devices. Security concerns were also raised regarding access to the local disks of the temporary host computer. To address these issues, the researchers proposed creating system profiles to improve performance and mitigate security risks.
