= GetDeb =

- Website type: Ubuntu Software Portal
- Available in: English
- Owner: João Pinto
- Creator: João Pinto
- Website: www.getdeb.net
- Commercial: Yes
- Registration: No
- Content license: GPL, LGP, CDDL, AGPL, MIT, BSD

GetDeb was an Ubuntu software portal providing legacy versions of software included in Old LTS Ubuntu versions, and software that is omitted from the official repositories. PlayDeb was a sister project with an explicit focus on games. The names come from the .deb package format used by Ubuntu. GetDeb and PlayDeb services could also be used by Ubuntu derivatives starting with 16.04 as the 14.04 packages were removed once when Ubuntu 14.04 reached EOL. Both websites have been redirected to a spam site, and should no longer be trusted.

== Purpose ==
Standard Ubuntu releases receive support for nine months and LTS releases for five years. During this support lifetime, they will receive official security fixes, high-impact bug fixes and conservative, substantially beneficial low-risk bug fixes - but no completely new versions of applications for 2 years and the security updates for only 3 years. This was until it was revealed that Ubuntu 18.04 will receive 10 years of LTS support matching up to distros like Solaris 11.3 for industrial applications and servers in the manufacturing and credit card industry.

GetDeb allowed its users to receive more up-to-date versions of popular software without upgrading their whole OS or installing from source code. These packages were only a slim minority as most of the packages have been abandoned. PlayDeb's purpose later was just to host these packages for LTS users while paying for hosting by covering stories related to gaming and FOSS Software.

== Pros and cons ==
GetDeb and PlayDeb served two primary purposes. They allowed Ubuntu users to install software that was not yet included in the main repositories, and offered current versions of many packages that were included in the Ubuntu repositories. The latter was of utility because, due to the release cycle adopted by Ubuntu, most packages will be several months out of date at the time of release, and will not receive feature updates until the next discrete release for stability reasons.

It is generally advisable to subscribe only to Ubuntu's own package repositories where possible, as software offered by GetDeb and PlayDeb was commonly out of date or unmaintained. For example, games like OpenSonic were no longer updated by PlayDeb. This would require that PlayDeb maintained the packages/forks and could cause conflicts and/or issues with main Ubuntu packages. Some packages are closed source and can not be recompiled for newer versions of Ubuntu. In many cases newer versions of software are only omitted from a specific Ubuntu release due to releases typically being static except for security updates. In some cases, software packaged by GetDeb and PlayDeb may also not have conformed to the Debian or Ubuntu packaging guidelines.

As of January 2019, the websites were bought by an unknown person and could be serving malware.

== Alternatives ==
GetDeb and PlayDeb overlapped somewhat in purpose with:

1. PPAs
2. Snap Packages
3. Source Compiling
4. Open Suse Build Service
5. Private Repos/Repositories
6. AppImages
7. Nix Package Manager
8. Flatpak
9. Docker Containers
10. NetBSD's PKG

== See also ==
- Personal Package Archive (PPA)
- deb (file format)
- Medibuntu
