= Windows 8 editions =

Windows 8, a major release of the Microsoft Windows operating system, was available in four different editions: Windows 8 (Core), Pro, Enterprise, and RT. Only Windows 8 (Core) and Pro were widely available at retailers. The other editions focus on other markets, such as embedded systems or enterprise. All editions support 32-bit IA-32 CPUs and x64 CPUs.

== Editions ==
Windows 8
Windows 8 (also sometimes referred to as Windows 8 Core to distinguish from the OS itself) is the basic edition of Windows for the IA-32 and x64 architectures. This edition contains features aimed at the home market segment and provides all of the basic new Windows 8 features.
A Single Language version is available on emerging markets, which does not support swithcing between languages.
Windows 8 Pro
Windows 8 Pro is comparable to Windows 7 Professional and Ultimate and is targeted towards enthusiasts and business users; it includes all the features of Windows 8. Additional features include the ability to receive Remote Desktop connections, the ability to participate in a Windows Server domain, Encrypting File System, Hyper-V, and Virtual Hard Disk Booting, Group Policy as well as BitLocker and BitLocker To Go.
Windows 8 Pro with Media Center
Windows 8 Pro with Media Center was never sold directly, but was included with the Windows 8 Pro Pack and temporarily offered for free on Microsoft's website as an upgrade from Windows 8 Pro. This edition adds Windows Media Center back from the premium editions of Windows 7. No official installation media exists; it must be downloaded from the Add Features to Windows 8 program. Besides the addition of Windows Media Center, it is identical to Windows 8 Pro.
Windows 8 Enterprise
Windows 8 Enterprise provides all the features in Windows 8 Pro (except the ability to install the Windows Media Center add-on), with additional features to assist with IT organization (see table below). This edition is available to Software Assurance customers, as well as MSDN and Technet Professional subscribers, and was released on 16 August 2012.
Windows RT
Windows RT is only available pre-installed on ARM-based devices such as tablet PCs. It includes touch-optimized desktop versions of the basic set of Office 2013 applications to users—Microsoft Word, Excel, PowerPoint, and OneNote, and supports BitLocker-based device encryption capabilities. Most business-focused features such as Group Policy, Remote Desktop and domain support are not included, as this edition is based on the Core edition.

Software for Windows RT can be either downloaded from Windows Store or sideloaded, although sideloading on Windows RT must first be enabled by purchasing additional licenses through Microsoft volume licensing outlet. Desktop software that runs on previous versions of Windows cannot be run on Windows RT as Windows Store apps are based on Windows Runtime API which differs from the traditional apps. According to CNET, these essential differences may raise the question of whether Windows RT is an edition of Windows: in a conversation with Mozilla, Microsoft deputy general counsel David Heiner was reported to have said Windows RT "isn't Windows anymore." Mozilla general counsel, however, dismissed the assertion on the basis that Windows RT has the same user interface, application programming interface and update mechanism.

Windows RT includes other limitations such as automatic updates and real-time protection being permanently enabled and creating a HomeGroup is not possible.

Unlike Windows Vista and Windows 7, there are no Home Basic, Home Premium, or Ultimate editions. Other missing features include Document services, location-aware printing, the network location aware service, system image restore, Offline files, Sync Center, Windows Media Player, and Windows Journal

=== Regional restrictions and variations ===
All mentioned editions have the ability to use language packs, enabling multiple user interface languages (this functionality was previously available in Ultimate or Enterprise edition of Windows 7 and Windows Vista). However, for emerging markets, a variation of Windows 8 without this capability, called Windows 8 Single Language, is sold. This edition can be upgraded to Windows 8 Pro. Furthermore, like in Windows Phone 7 and Windows Phone 8 (since the latter shares the same Windows NT kernel as its desktop variant), OEMs who preload Windows 8 can impose language locks to prevent using non-whitelisted languages. These exact choices depend on the device manufacturer and country/region of purchase (as well as the wireless carrier for cellular-connected devices). For example, a cellular-connected Samsung Ativ Smart PC running Windows 8 on AT&T only supports English, Spanish, French, German, Italian, and Korean (the last three are available as optional downloads).

Additional Windows 8 editions specially destined for European markets have the letter "N" (e.g. Windows 8.1 Enterprise N) suffixed to their names and do not include a bundled copy of Windows Media Player. Microsoft was required to create the "N" editions of Windows after the European Commission ruled in 2004 that it needed to provide a copy of Windows without Windows Media Player tied in.

Windows 8.1 with Bing is a reduced-cost SKU of Windows 8.1 for OEMs that was introduced in May 2014. It was introduced as part of an effort to encourage the production of low-cost devices, whilst "driving end-user usage of Microsoft Services such as Bing and OneDrive". It is subsidized by Microsoft's Bing search engine, which is set as the default within Internet Explorer, and cannot be changed to a third-party alternative by the OEM. This restriction does not apply to end-users, who can still change the default search engine freely after installation. It is otherwise identical to the base edition.

== Editions for embedded systems ==
Windows Embedded 8 Standard
Windows Embedded 8 Standard is a componentized edition of Windows 8 for use in specialized devices. It was released on 20 March 2013. Notable for being the only edition of Windows 8 to not get an update to 8.1. It reached the end of mainstream support on July 10, 2018, and reached the end of extended support on July 11, 2023.
Windows Embedded 8 Industry
Windows Embedded 8 Industry is an edition of Windows 8 for use in industrial devices. It was released on 2 April 2013 and is available in Pro, Pro Retail, and Enterprise editions.
Windows Embedded 8 [For Embedded Systems (FES)]
Includes Windows Embedded 8 Pro and Windows Embedded 8 Enterprise editions, which are binary identical to their respective non-embedded editions, differing only in licensing.

These are the final editions of Windows to use the Windows Embedded branding. With the release of Windows 10, Microsoft rebranded the series to Windows IoT Enterprise.

== Upgrade compatibility ==
The following in-place upgrade paths are supported from Windows 7. It is only possible to upgrade from an IA-32 variant of Windows 7 to an IA-32 variant of Windows 8; an x64 variant of Windows 7 can only be upgraded to an x64 variant of Windows 8. The retail package entitled Windows 8 Pro Upgrade was restricted to upgrading a computer with licensed Windows XP SP3, Windows Vista or Windows 7. Finally, there is no upgrade path for Windows RT.

Windows 8 upgrade path
Edition of Windows 7 to upgrade from	Edition of Windows 8 to upgrade to		
Edition of Windows 7 to upgrade from	Core	Pro	Enterprise
Starter	Yes	Yes	No
Home Basic	Yes	Yes	No
Home Premium	Yes	Yes	No
Ultimate	No	Yes	No
Professional	No	Yes	Yes
Enterprise	No	No	Yes

In-upgrade is not available for Windows Vista and Windows XP. However, on Windows XP SP3 and Windows Vista RTM, it is possible to perform a clean install while preserving personal files. On Windows Vista SP1, it is possible to perform a clean install but save system settings as well. While Microsoft still refers to the scenarios as "upgrade", the user still need to reinstall all apps, carry out necessary license activation steps and reinstate app settings.

== Comparison chart ==
Comparison of Windows 8/8.1 editions
Features	RT	Core	Pro	Enterprise
Availability	Pre-installed on devices (OEM)	OEM, Retail, SLP	OEM, Retail, SLP, Volume License	Volume License customers
Architecture	ARM (32-bit)	IA-32 (32-bit) or x64 (64-bit)	IA-32 (32-bit) or x64 (64-bit)	IA-32 (32-bit) or x64 (64-bit)
Maximum physical memory (RAM)	4 GB	128 GB on x64 4 GB on IA-32	512 GB on x64 4 GB on IA-32	512 GB on x64 4 GB on IA-32
Secure Boot	Yes	Yes	Yes	Yes
Picture password	Yes	Yes	Yes	Yes
Start screen, Semantic Zoom, Live Tiles	Yes	Yes	Yes	Yes
Touch and Thumb keyboard	Yes	Yes	Yes	Yes
Language packs	Yes	Not on Single Language	Yes	Yes
Updated File Explorer	Yes	Yes	Yes	Yes
Standard apps (Note: Includes Mail, Calendar, People, Messaging, Photos, Reader, Music, Video, Bing, Weather, Sports, News, Finance, Camera, Travel, Maps and SkyDrive app.)	Yes	Yes	Yes	Yes
File History	Yes	Yes	Yes	Yes
Refresh and reset of OS	Yes	Yes	Yes	Yes
Play To	Yes	Yes	Yes	Yes
Connected Standby	Yes	Yes	Yes	Yes
Better multi-monitor support	Yes	Yes	Yes	Yes
New Windows Task Manager	Yes	Yes	Yes	Yes
ISO image and VHD mounting	Yes	Yes	Yes	Yes
Mobile broadband features	Yes	Yes	Yes	Yes
Microsoft account integration	Yes	Yes	Yes	Yes
Internet Explorer 10	Yes	Yes	Yes	Yes
SmartScreen	Yes	Yes	Yes	Yes
Windows Store	Yes	Yes	Yes	Yes
Xbox Live (including Xbox Live Arcade)	Partial	Partial	Partial	Partial
Exchange ActiveSync	Yes	Yes	Yes	Yes
Snap	Yes	Yes	Yes	Yes
Desktop	Yes	Yes	Yes	Yes
Parental Controls	Yes	Yes	Yes	Yes
Device encryption (Note: Device encryption, a feature introduced in Windows Mobile 6.5, encrypts the contents of a mobile device to enhance their security.)	Yes	With Windows 8.1	With Windows 8.1	With Windows 8.1
Support for language packs and switching	Yes	Not on Single Language	Yes	Yes
Can connect to a VPN?	No	No	Yes	Yes
Disabling automatic updates	No	Yes	Yes	Yes
Disabling Windows Defender	No	Yes	Yes	Yes
Supported third-party apps	Windows Store apps only	Windows Store and desktop	Windows Store and desktop	Windows Store and desktop
Remote Desktop	Client only	Client only	Client and host	Client and host
Storage spaces	No	Yes	Yes	Yes
Windows Media Player	No	Yes	Yes	Yes
BitLocker and EFS	No	No	Yes	Yes
Sideload Windows Store apps	Partial (Note: Not all computers running Windows 8 can perform sideloading. Out-of-box sideloading support is only available for Windows 8 Enterprise computers that have joined a Windows domain. Sideloading on Windows RT and Windows 8 Pro computers as well as Windows 8 Enterprise computers without a domain affiliation requires purchase of additional licenses through Microsoft volume licensing outlet.)	No	Partial	Partial
Boot from VHD	No	No	Yes	Yes
Can join a Windows domain?	Disabled by default	No	Yes	Yes
Group Policy	Yes	No	Yes	Yes
Hyper-V	No	No	x64 SKUs only	x64 SKUs only
AppLocker (Note: AppLocker enforces application whitelisting or blacklisting in a corporate environment. In other words, it can be used to allow or prevent execution of software based on name, version number or publisher.)	No	No	No	Yes
Windows To Go	No	No	No	Yes
DirectAccess	No	No	No	Yes
BranchCache (Note: BranchCache, a feature of Windows 7 and later, locally caches contents received from a file server or web server to enable faster subsequent uses.)	No	No	No	Yes
Can be virtualized by RemoteFX?	No	No	No	Yes
Services for Network File System	No	No	No	Yes
Subsystem for Unix-based Applications	No	No	No	Deprecated
Windows Media Center	No	No	Optional	No
Office 2013 apps bundled with OS	Yes (Note: Includes Word, Excel, PowerPoint, and OneNote RT. Windows RT 8.1 adds Outlook.)	No	No	No
Features	Windows RT	Windows 8 (Core)	Windows 8 Pro	Windows 8 Enterprise
