= Windows To Go =

Feature in several Microsoft Windows versions

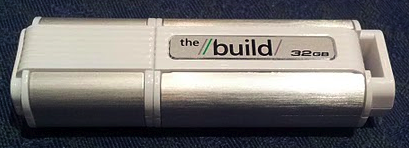
- A USB flash drive offered by Microsoft at the 2011 Build conference, with Windows To Go pre-installed
- Operating system: Windows 8, Windows 8.1, Windows 10 (up to version 1909)
- Type: Live USB

Windows To Go was a feature in Windows 8 Enterprise, Windows 8.1 Enterprise, Windows 10 Education, and Windows 10 Enterprise versions up to the November 2019 update, that allows the system to boot and run from certain USB mass storage devices such as USB flash drives and external hard disk drives which have been certified by Microsoft as compatible. It is a fully manageable corporate Windows environment. The development of Windows To Go was discontinued by Microsoft in 2019, and is no longer available in Windows 10 as of the May 2020 update (version 2004).

It was intended to allow enterprise administrators to provide users with an imaged version of Windows that reflects the corporate desktop. Although creation of Windows To Go drives was not officially supported by non-Enterprise (or Education) editions of Windows 8.x and 10, some information has been published describing various ways to install Windows To Go using any edition of Windows 8.x and 10 and any bootable USB device.

== History ==
Before Windows 8, only embedded versions of Windows, such as Windows Embedded Standard 7, supported booting from USB storage devices. In April 2011, after the leak of Windows 8 build 7850, some users noticed that those builds included a program called "Portable Workspace Creator", indicating it was intended to create bootable USB drives of Windows 8. In September 2011, Microsoft officially announced Windows To Go at the Build conference, and distributed bootable 32 GB USB flash drives with Windows To Go pre-installed.

== Differences from standard installation ==
Windows To Go has several significant differences compared to a standard installation of Windows 8 on a non-removable storage (such as hard disk drives or solid-state drives).

Drive removal detection
As a safety measure designed to prevent data loss, Windows pauses the entire system if the USB drive is removed, and resumes operation immediately when the drive is inserted within 60 seconds of removal. If the drive is not inserted in that time-frame, the computer shuts down to prevent possible confidential or sensitive information being displayed on the screen or stored in RAM. It is also possible to encrypt a Windows To Go drive using BitLocker.
Driver configuration
The first time Windows To Go boots on a particular computer, it installs the drivers for that particular hardware and multiple reboots may be required. Subsequent boots on a particular computer go straight into Windows.
Windows Store
Starting with Windows 8.1, Windows Store is enabled and working by default in Windows To Go. A Group Policy object exists to manage this. Using Group Policy, Windows Store can be enabled for a Windows To Go workspace (limited to one PC) and Store apps can be used on that workspace.
Local hardware inaccessible
In default configurations, Windows To Go installations do not see the local hard disk drive or solid-state drive present in a host computer. This can be changed by policy (OfflineInternal).

== Hardware considerations ==
Windows To Go works with USB 2.0 and faster USB connections, and both on legacy BIOS and UEFI firmware. Not all USB drives can be used in this environment; Microsoft has set specific requirements that the USB drive must meet in order to be a supported device. As of June 2017, there are 12 USB devices listed as supported by Microsoft for Windows To Go.

When using a PC as a host, only hardware certified for use with either Windows 7 or Windows 8 will work well with Windows To Go. Although Microsoft does not provide support for this feature on Windows RT or Macintosh computers, it is possible to boot Windows To Go on a Mac.

== Licensing ==
With a new companion device license from Microsoft Software Assurance, employees can use Windows To Go on any Software Assurance licensed computer as well as their home PC.

== Reception ==
Simon Bisson, writing for ZDNet, called Windows To Go "One of the more interesting features of Windows 8", noting "Even though we were using a USB 2.0 port performance was good, with no noticeable lag" and calling it "a very useful way of running of Windows 8".

Michael S. Lasky, writing for laptopmag.com, wrote "For IT departments that want to ensure that employees can safely access a corporate network, Windows To Go USB drives are incredibly convenient. Having the ability to instantly remake any Windows PC into your own secure, personal computer is a worthwhile and productive time-saver."

== Discontinuation ==
After the release of the May 2019 update (version 1903) for Windows 10, Microsoft announced that Windows To Go was no longer being developed. Microsoft stated in its discontinuation statement that "WTG does not support feature updates. Therefore, it does not enable you to stay current. Additionally, WTG requires a specific type of USB drive that many OEMs no longer support." Windows To Go has been removed in Windows 10 starting with the May 2020 update (version 2004).

== See also ==
- Intel Compute Stick
- Features new to Windows 8
- List of tools to create bootable USB
- VMware ThinApp
- Windows Preinstallation Environment
