= Fedora Linux =

Linux distribution by Fedora Project

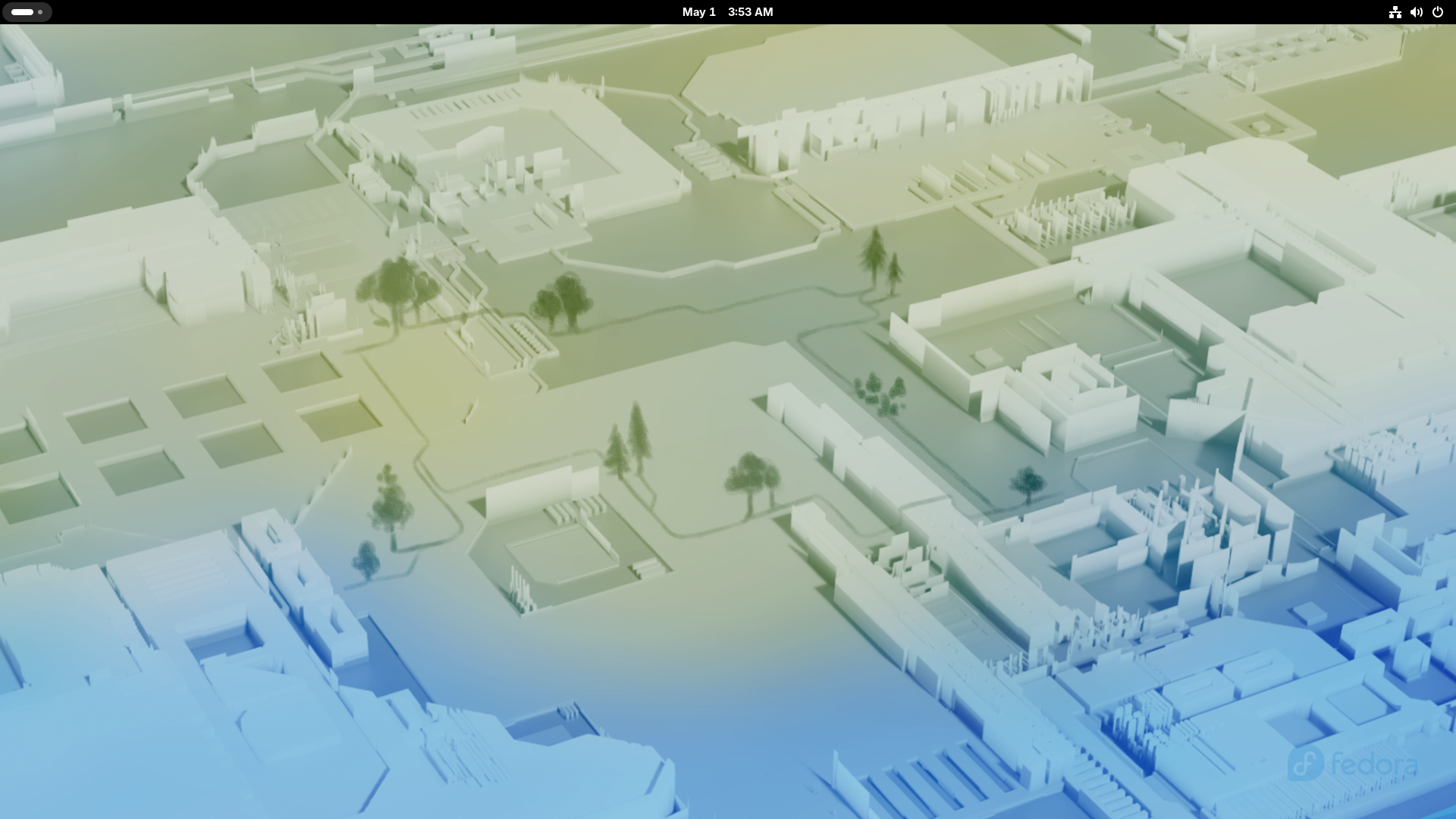
- Fedora Workstation 44 with the GNOME Desktop Environment
- Developer: Fedora Project
- OS family: Unix-like
- Working state: Current
- Source model: Open source
- Initial release: 4 November 2003; 23 years ago
- Latest release: 45 / 3 November 2026; 6 days ago
- Repository: src.fedoraproject.org
- Marketing target: Desktop computers, workstations, servers, supercomputers
- Package manager: RPM (DNF), Flatpak, libostree
- Supported platforms: Primary: x86-64, armhf, AArch64; Alternative: mips64el, mipsel, ppc64le, RISC-V, s390x
- Kernel type: Monolithic (Linux kernel)
- Userland: GNU
- Default user interface: GNOME Shell; KDE Plasma
- License: GPL and various free software licenses, plus proprietary firmware files
- Official website: fedoraproject.org

Fedora Linux is a Linux distribution developed by the Fedora Project. It was originally developed in 2003 as a continuation of the Red Hat Linux project. It contains software distributed under various free and open-source licenses and aims to be on the leading edge of open-source technologies. It is now the upstream source for CentOS Stream and Red Hat Enterprise Linux.

Since the release of Fedora 21 in December 2014, three editions have been made available: personal computer, server and cloud computing. This was expanded to five editions for containerization and Internet of Things (IoT) as of the release of Fedora 37 in November 2022. A new version of Fedora Linux is usually released roughly every six months.

As of February 2016, Fedora Linux has an estimated 1.2 million users, including Linus Torvalds, creator of the Linux kernel.

== History ==
The name of Fedora derives from the original "Fedora Linux", a volunteer project that provided extra software for the Red Hat Linux distribution, and from the characteristic fedora hat used in Red Hat's "Shadowman" logo. Warren Togami began Fedora Linux in 2002 as an undergraduate project at the University of Hawaii, intended to provide a single repository for well-tested third-party software packages so that non-Red Hat software would be easier to find, develop, and use. The key difference between Fedora Linux and Red Hat Linux was that Fedora's repository development would be collaborative with the global volunteer community. The original Fedora Linux was eventually absorbed into the Fedora Project, carrying with it this collaborative approach. The Fedora Project is sponsored primarily by Red Hat with additional support and sponsors from other companies and organizations.

In 2003, Fedora Linux and Red Hat Linux merged to create the Fedora Project and its distribution, Fedora Core. The Red Hat Linux product was discontinued so the team could focus on their paid version for servers: Red Hat Enterprise Linux. Red Hat Enterprise Linux was to be Red Hat's only officially supported Linux distribution, while Fedora was to be a community distribution. Red Hat Enterprise Linux branches its releases from versions of Fedora.

Before Fedora 7, Fedora Linux was called Fedora Core after the name of one of the two main software repositories - Core and Extras. Fedora Core contained all the base packages that were required by the operating system, as well as other packages that were distributed along with the installation media, and was maintained only by Red Hat developers. Fedora Extras, the secondary repository that had been included since Fedora Core 3, was community-maintained and not distributed along with the installation media. Upon the release of Fedora 7, the distinction between Fedora Core and Fedora Extras was eliminated.

Since the release of Fedora 21, as an effort to bring modularization to the Fedora distribution and make development more agile, three different versions are available: Workstation, focused on the personal computer, Server and Atomic for servers, Atomic being the version meant for cloud computing.

Fedora is a trademark of Red Hat, Inc. Red Hat's application for trademark status for the name "Fedora" was disputed by Cornell University and the University of Virginia Library, creators of the unrelated Fedora Commons digital repository management software. The issue was resolved and the parties settled on a co-existence agreement that stated that the Cornell-UVA project could use the name when clearly associated with open source software for digital object repository systems and that Red Hat could use the name when it was clearly associated with open source computer operating systems.

In April 2020, project leader Matthew Miller announced that Fedora Workstation would be shipping on select new ThinkPad laptops, thanks to a new partnership with Lenovo.

Framework officially supports Fedora Workstation on their laptops.

== Features ==
Fedora has a reputation for focusing on innovation, integrating new technologies early on and working closely with upstream Linux communities. Making changes upstream instead of specifically for Fedora Linux ensures that the changes are available to all Linux distributions.

Fedora Linux has a relatively short life cycle: Each version is usually supported for at least 13 months, where version X is supported only until one month after version X+2 is released and with approximately six months between most versions. Fedora users can upgrade from version to version without reinstalling.

The default desktop environment is GNOME, and the default user interface is the GNOME Shell. Other desktop environments are available, including KDE Plasma, COSMIC, Xfce, LXQt, LXDE, MATE, Cinnamon, and Budgie as well as window managers including i3, Sway, and Miracle.

A live media drive can be created using Fedora Media Writer, the official bootable USB creator for Fedora Linux, or the dd command, allowing users to try Fedora Linux without writing any changes to their hard drives.

=== Package management ===
Most Fedora Linux editions use the RPM package management system and DNF as a tool to manage installed software. DNF uses libsolv, an external dependency resolver. Flatpak is also included by default.

The CoreOS and Silverblue editions are designed for operating system-level virtualization. These editions use rpm-ostree (a hybrid transactional image/package system), and traditional RPM (or other package management systems) can be used in containers.

=== Security ===
Fedora Linux uses Security-Enhanced Linux by default, which implements a variety of security policies, including mandatory access controls, which Fedora adopted early on. Fedora provides a hardening wrapper, and does hardening for all of its packages by using compiler features such as position-independent executable (PIE). Fedora also ships with firewalld as a default firewall.

=== Software ===
Fedora Workstation comes preinstalled with a wide range of software such as LibreOffice and Firefox. Additional software is available from the software repositories and can be installed using the DNF package manager or GNOME Software.

Additionally, extra repositories can be added to the system, so that software not available in Fedora Linux can be installed easily. Software that is not available via official Fedora repositories, either because it does not meet Fedora's definition of free software or because its distribution may violate US law, can be installed using third-party repositories. Popular third-party repositories include RPM Fusion free and non-free repositories. Fedora also provides users with an easy-to-use build system for creating their own repositories called Copr.

Since the release of Fedora 25, the operating system defaults to the Wayland display server protocol, which replaced the X Window System. As of Fedora 41, both the GNOME and KDE editions do not ship with X.Org Server session support by default.

== Editions ==
Beginning with Fedora 21, the distribution was available in three editions, expanded to six editions as of version 42.

=== Workstation ===
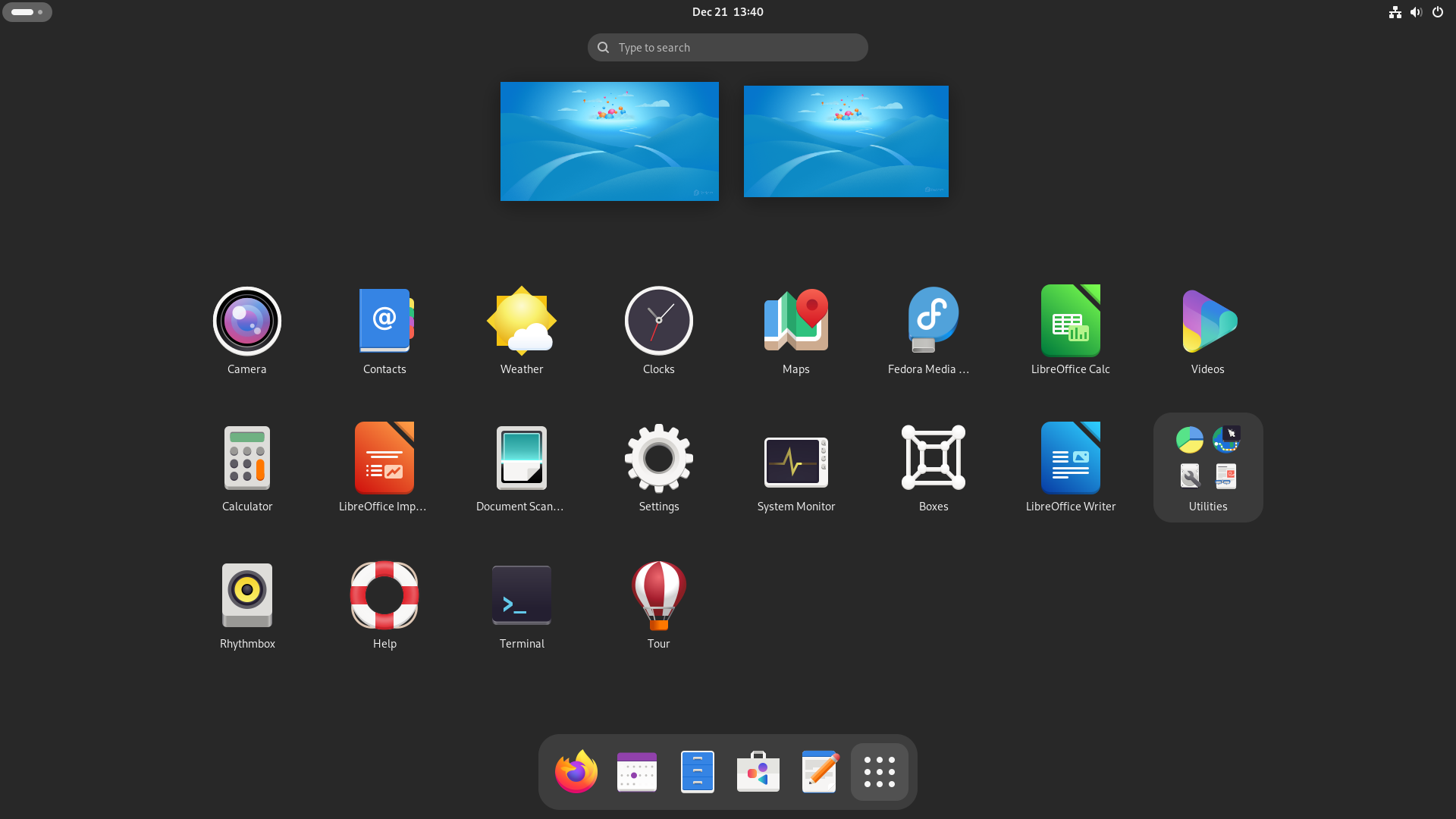
Fedora Workstation 41 with its default applications

The Fedora Workstation editions target users who want a reliable, user-friendly, and powerful operating system for their laptop or desktop computer while still being on the cutting edge of new technologies. They come with GNOME by default but other desktops can be installed, including KDE Plasma, which was promoted to a regular edition on the same level as Fedora Workstation with GNOME starting with Fedora 42.

==== Spins and remixes ====
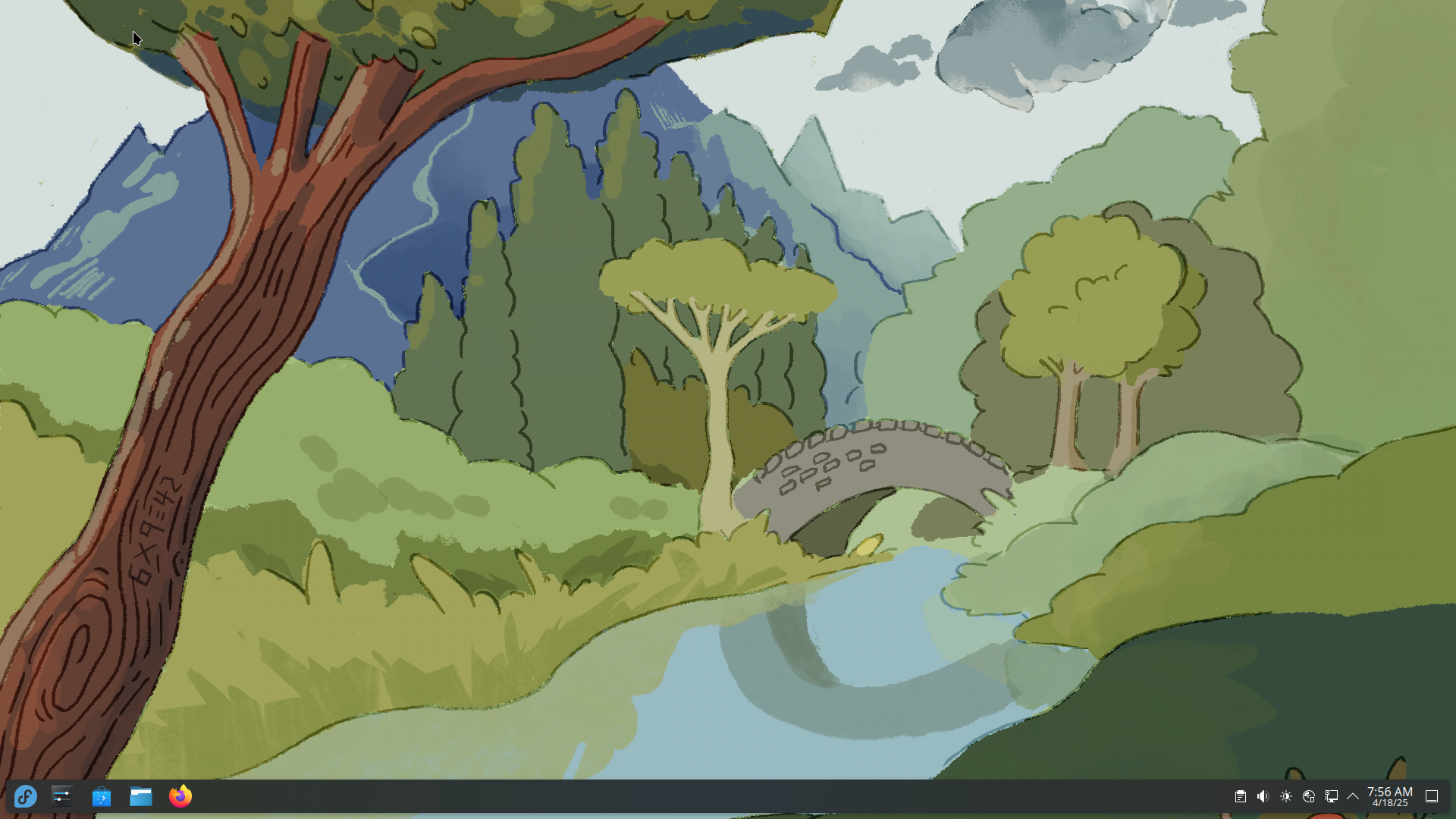
Fedora with the KDE Plasma Desktop, formerly one of the several official Fedora Spins. As of Fedora 42, it became an official Fedora edition alongside Fedora Workstation with GNOME.

The Fedora project officially distributes different variations called "Fedora Spins" which are Fedora Linux with different desktop environments. The current official spins, as of Fedora 44, are Xfce, LXQt, MATE (with Compiz), Cinnamon, LXDE, SoaS, i3, KDE Plasma Mobile, Budgie, Sway, Miracle, and COSMIC.

In addition to Spins, which are official variants of the Fedora system, the project allows unofficial variants to use the term "Fedora Remix" without asking for further permission, although a different logo (provided) is required.

=== Atomic desktops ===
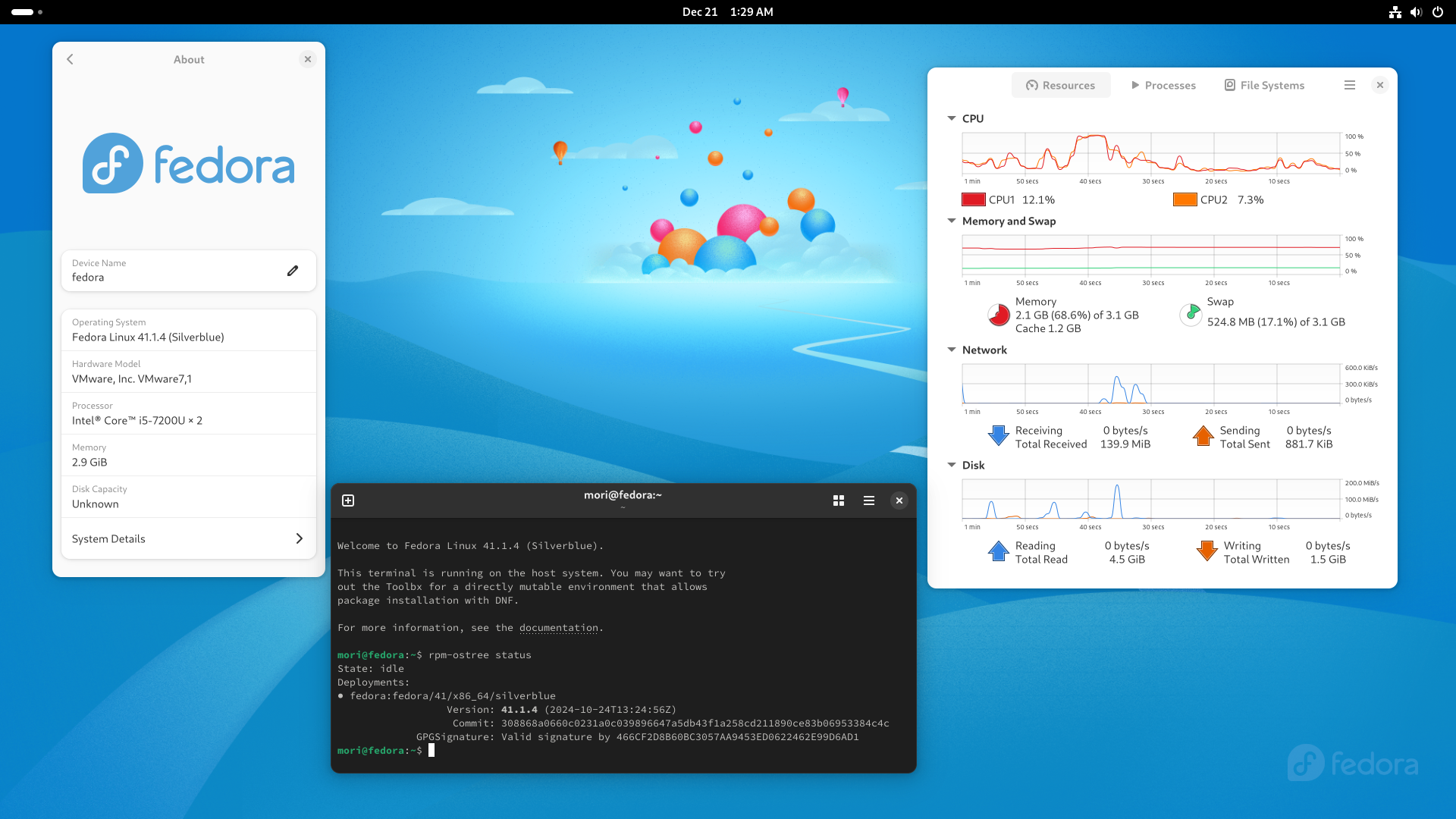
A fresh install of Silverblue 41

Fedora offers immutable editions known as "Atomic Desktops". Separate editions are offered per desktop environment, currently there are editions for Budgie, COSMIC, GNOME (Silverblue), KDE Plasma (Kinoite) and Sway. Every atomic desktop installation is identical to every other installation of the same version, and it never changes as it is used. The immutable design is intended to make the operating system more stable, less prone to bugs, easier to test and develop, and create a platform for containerized applications as well as container-based software development. Applications and containers are kept separate from the host system. OS updates are fast and there is no installation stage. It is possible to roll back to the previous version of the operating system, if something goes wrong.

The long-term goal for this effort is to transform Fedora Workstation into an image-based system where applications are separate from the OS, and updates are atomic. Fedora developers, Red Hat engineers, along with independent contributors have been developing or contributing to software used in the atomic desktops such as libostree, Wayland, Flatpak, and rpm-ostree support in GNOME Software, etc. Project Atomic added new features like package layering to rpm-ostree and added rpm-ostree support to Anaconda.

=== Server ===
Its target usage is for servers. It includes the latest data center technologies. This edition does not come with a desktop environment, but one can be installed. From Fedora 28, Server Edition will deliver Fedora Modularity, adding support for alternative update streams for popular software such as Node.js and Go.

=== IoT ===
Images of Fedora Linux tailored to running on Internet of Things devices. It supports x86_64, aarch64 and armhfp processors.

=== CoreOS ===
The successor of Fedora Atomic Host (Project Atomic) and Container Linux after Fedora 29, it provides a minimal image of Fedora Linux which includes just the bare essentials. This is not to be confused with Fedora Core. It is meant for deployment in cloud computing. It provides Fedora CoreOS images which are optimized minimal images for deploying containers. CoreOS replaced the established Container Linux when it was merged with Project Atomic after its acquisition by Red Hat in January 2018.

=== Labs ===
Similar to Debian blends, the Fedora Project also distributes custom variations of Fedora Linux called Fedora Labs. These are built with specific sets of software packages, targeting specific interests such as gaming, security, design, robotics, and scientific computing (that includes SciPy, Octave, Kile, Xfig and Inkscape).

The Fedora AOS (Appliance Operating System) was a specialized spin of Fedora Linux with reduced memory footprint for use in software appliances. Appliances are pre-installed, pre-configured, system images. This spin was intended to make it easier for anyone (developers, independent software vendors (ISV), original equipment manufacturers (OEM), etc.) to create and deploy virtual appliances.

=== Architectures ===
x86-64 and ARM AArch64 are the primary architectures supported by Fedora. As of release 38, Fedora also supports IBM Power64le, IBM Z ("s390x"), MIPS-64el, MIPS-el and RISC-V as secondary architectures.

Fedora 28 was the last release that supported ppc64 and users are advised to move to the little endian ppc64le variant. Fedora 36 was the last release with support for ARM-hfp.

=== Alternatives ===
The Fedora Project also distributes several other versions with fewer use cases than mentioned above, like network installers and minimal installation images. They are intended for special cases or expert users that want to have custom installations or configuring Fedora from scratch.

In addition, all acceptable licenses for Fedora Linux (including copyright, trademark, and patent licenses) must be applicable not only to Red Hat or Fedora, but also to all recipients downstream. This means that any "Fedora-only" licenses, or licenses with specific terms that Red Hat or Fedora meets but that other recipients would not are not acceptable (and almost certainly non-free, as a result).

== Development and community ==
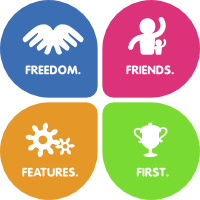
The core values of the Fedora community

Development of the operating system and supporting programs is headed by the Fedora Project, which is composed of a community of developers and volunteers, and also Red Hat employees. The council is the top-level community leadership and governance body. Other bodies include the Fedora Engineering Steering Committee, responsible for the technical decisions behind the development of Fedora, and Fedora Mindshare Committee which coordinates outreach and non-technical activities, including representation of Fedora Worldwide e.g.: Ambassadors Program, CommOps team and Marketing, Design and Websites Team.

=== AI policies and proposals ===
On July 2024, Fedora released a survey to its users on what they thought about introducing AI technologies into Fedora. Despite the survey announcer Aoife Moloney wanting to "keep the tone of this survey positive about AI", data scientist Greg Sutcliffe found that "'no' is pretty much the largest category in every case" on using AI on tasks in Fedora, with a strong rejection on AI usage overall. Despite that, a draft policy for AI policy was published on September 22, 2025 and was approved a month later on October 22, 2025.

In 2026, a proposal to make a variant of Fedora specifically for AI was made. The proposal was set up so that changes in the Fedora Project would make it easier for creation of the Fedora AI variant, including the setup of a LTS kernel on Fedora. OSNews writer Thron Holwerda noted the Fedora Project Leader Jef Spaleta responded to criticism that this AI variant would damage the reputation of Fedora with:

As the Fedora Project Leader, I am absolutely not concerned about the reputational damage to this project that comes with setting up an entirely new output attractive to developers who want to make use of AI tools.

As a result of the discussion; Fernando Fernandez Mancera, a long-time Fedora Contributor and Linux kernel hacker, left the Fedora Project. The Fedora AI proposal was unanimously approved on May 6, though stalled two days later after two council members changed their vote after significant community backlash over the proposal. Justin Wheeler, whilst 'still strongly supporting the proposal' posted his vote to reject the proposal (-1) on May 8 after 'public and private feedback' highlighted the significant structural changes that would be required, and that feedback from kernel subject-matter experts had to be formally incorporated into the proposal. On May 14, Miro Hrončok posted his vote to reject the proposal, after concerns were raised to him after the initial vote that the Fedora community was "not supportive of this initiative as is". Hrončok conceded that his assumptions about proposal being only "additive" in nature and that it would not be controversial were incorrect, and felt that further understanding is required before he could approve the proposal "with a clear conscience."

== Releases ==
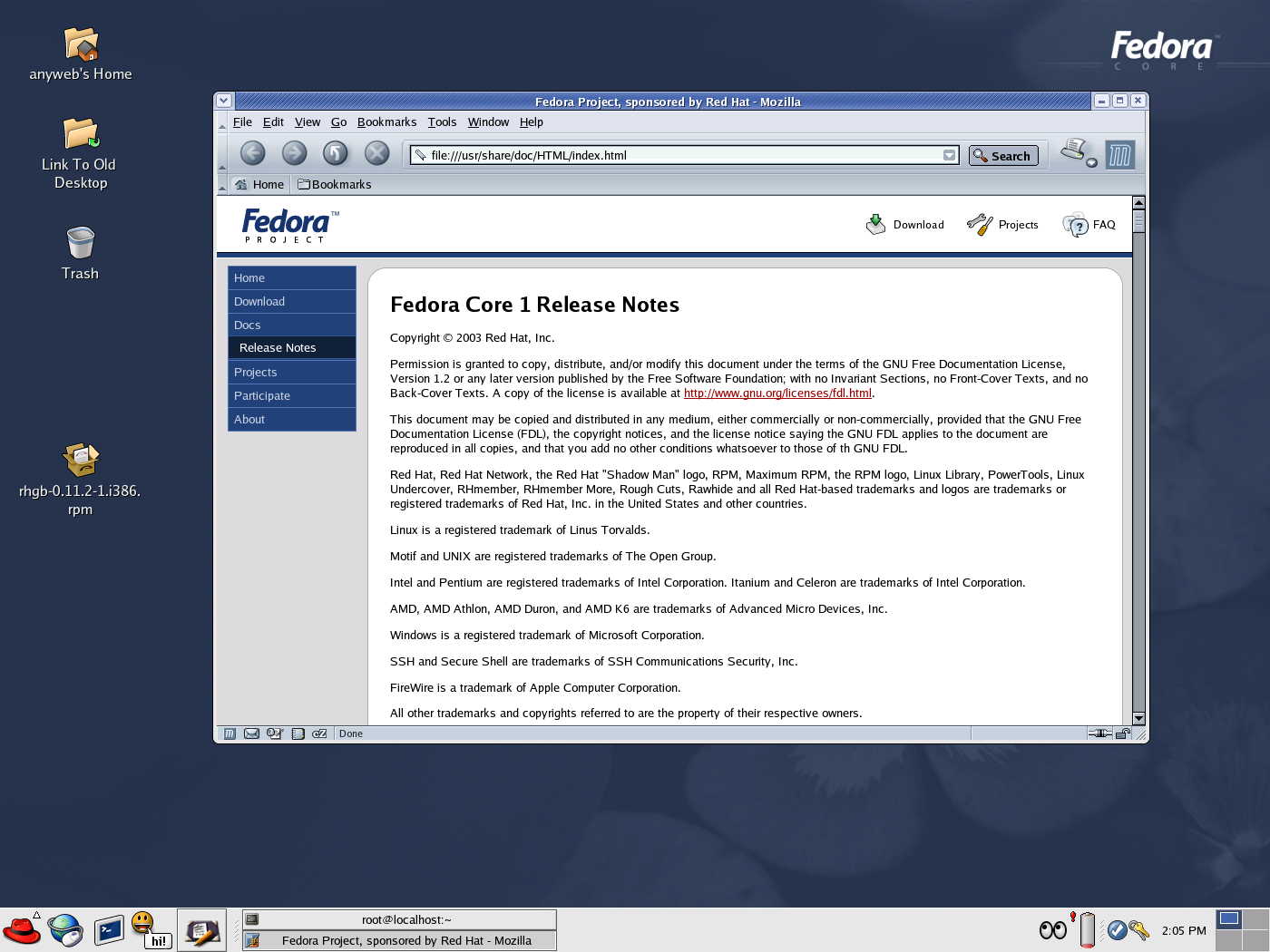
Fedora Core 1.0, a continuation of Red Hat Linux with GNOME 2.4 (November 2003)

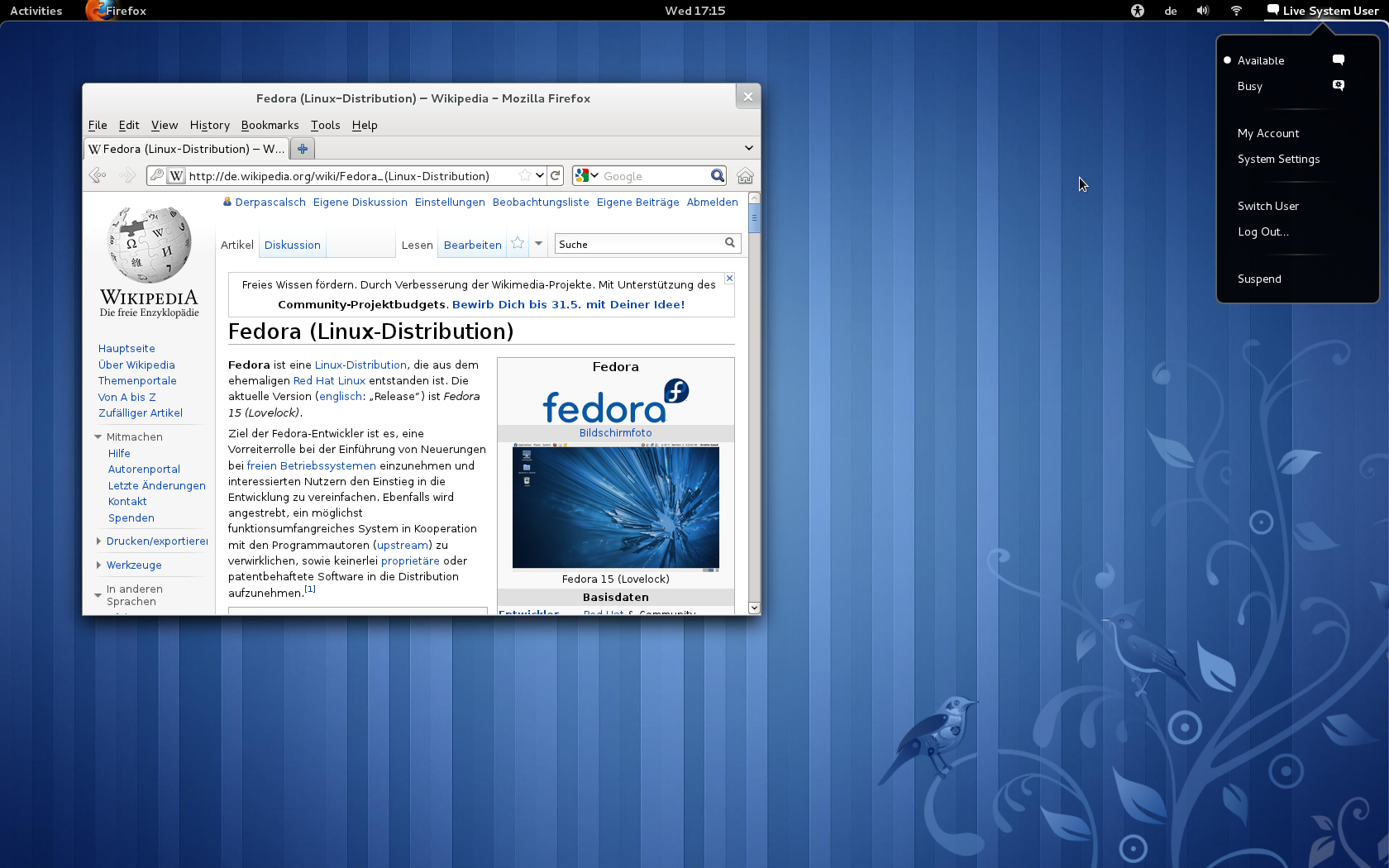
Fedora 15 (Lovelock), the first release with GNOME 3 and GNOME Shell (May 2011)

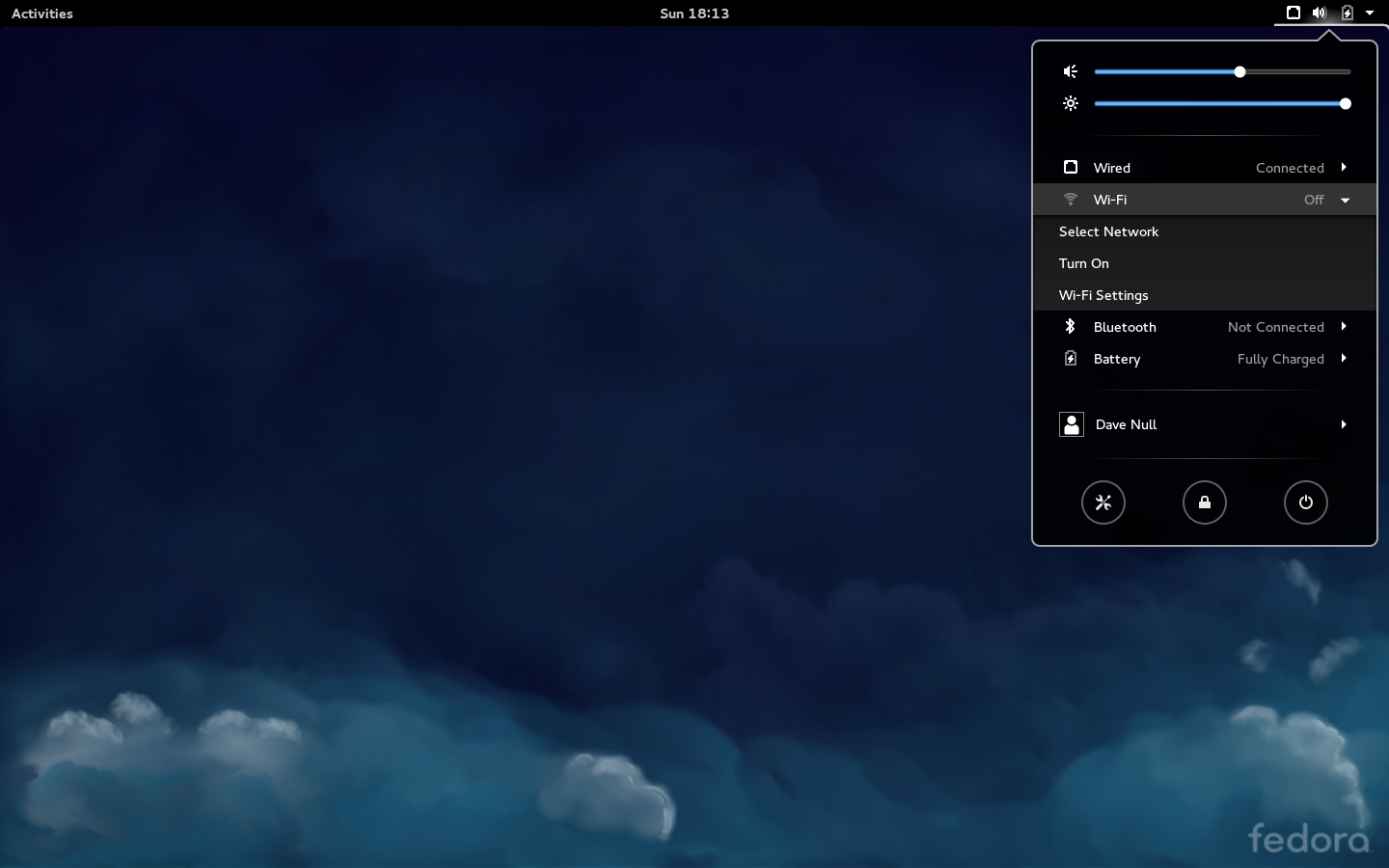
Fedora 21, a version that brought experimental Wayland and HiDPI support (December 2014)

Fedora has a relatively short life cycle: version X is supported only until 1 month after version X+2 is released and with approximately 6 months between most versions, meaning a version of Fedora is usually supported for at least 13 months, possibly longer. Fedora users can upgrade from version to version without reinstalling.

The current release is Fedora 45, which was released on 3 November 2026.

Releases of Fedora Linux
Version	Release	End-of-life	Kernel (Note: Latest version per release.)	GNOME
1 (Yarrow)	2003-11-05	2004-09-20	2.4.22	2.4
2 (Tettnang)	2004-05-18	2005-04-11	2.6.5	2.6
3 (Heidelberg)	2004-11-08	2006-01-16	2.6.9	2.8
4 (Stentz)	2005-06-13	2006-08-07	2.6.11	2.10
5 (Bordeaux)	2006-03-20	2007-07-02	2.6.15	2.14
6 (Zod)	2006-10-24	2007-12-07	2.6.18	2.16
7 (Moonshine)	2007-05-31	2008-06-13	2.6.23	2.18
8 (Werewolf)	2007-11-08	2009-01-07	2.6.26	2.20
9 (Sulphur)	2008-05-13	2009-07-10	2.6.27	2.22
10 (Cambridge)	2008-11-25	2009-12-17	2.6.27	2.24
11 (Leonidas)	2009-06-09	2010-06-25	2.6.30	2.26
12 (Constantine)	2009-11-17	2010-12-02	2.6.32	2.28
13 (Goddard)	2010-05-25	2011-06-24	2.6.34	2.30
14 (Laughlin)	2010-11-02	2011-12-09	2.6.35	2.32
15 (Lovelock)	2011-05-24	2012-06-26	2.6.43	3.0
16 (Verne)	2011-11-08	2013-02-12	3.6	3.2
17 (Beefy Miracle)	2012-05-29	2013-07-30	3.9	3.4
18 (Spherical Cow)	2013-01-15	2014-01-14	3.11	3.6
19 (Schrödinger's Cat)	2013-07-02	2015-01-06	3.14	3.8
20 (Heisenbug)	2013-12-17	2015-06-23	3.19	3.10
21	2014-12-09	2015-12-01	4.1	3.14
22	2015-05-26	2016-07-19	4.4	3.16
23	2015-11-03	2016-12-20	4.8	3.18
24	2016-06-21	2017-08-08	4.11	3.20
25	2016-11-22	2017-12-12	4.13	3.22
26	2017-07-11	2018-05-29	4.16	3.24
27	2017-11-14	2018-11-30	4.18	3.26
28	2018-05-01	2019-05-28	5.0	3.28
29	2018-10-30	2019-11-26	5.3	3.30
30	2019-04-30	2020-05-26	5.6	3.32
31	2019-10-29	2020-11-24	5.8	3.34
32	2020-04-28	2021-05-25	5.11	3.36
33	2020-10-27	2021-11-30	5.14	3.38
34	2021-04-27	2022-06-07	5.17	40
35	2021-11-02	2022-12-13	6.0	41
36	2022-05-10	2023-05-16	6.2	42
37	2022-11-15	2023-12-05	6.5	43
38	2023-04-18	2024-05-21	6.8	44
39	2023-11-07	2024-11-26	6.11	45
40	2024-04-23	2025-05-13	6.14	46
41	2024-10-29	2025-12-15	6.17	47
42 (Adams)	2025-04-15	2026-05-27	6.19	48
43	2025-10-28	2026-12-09	7.2	49
44	2026-04-28	2027-06-02	7.2	50
45	2026-11-03	2027-12-08	7.2	51
46	2027-04-20		7.4	
47	2027-10-26			
Legend: Unsupported Supported Latest version Preview version Future version

=== Rawhide ===
Rawhide is the development tree for Fedora. This is a copy of a complete Fedora distribution where new software is added and tested, before inclusion in a later stable release. As such, Rawhide is often more feature rich than the current stable release. In many cases, the software is made of CVS, Subversion or Git source code snapshots which are often actively developed by programmers. Although Rawhide is targeted at advanced users, testers, and package maintainers, it is capable of being a primary operating system. Users interested in the Rawhide branch often update on a daily basis and help troubleshoot problems. Rawhide users do not have to upgrade between different versions as it follows a rolling release update model.

== See also ==
- ABRT
- Fedora Media Writer
- List of Linux distributions § RPM-based
