= Linux (disambiguation) =

Linux is a family of computer operating systems based on the Linux kernel.

Linux may also refer to:

- 9885 Linux, an asteroid
- Linux distribution, an operating system made as a collection of software based on the Linux kernel
- Linux kernel, an operating system kernel

== See also ==
- List of Linux distributions
