= Hanthana Linux (operating system) =

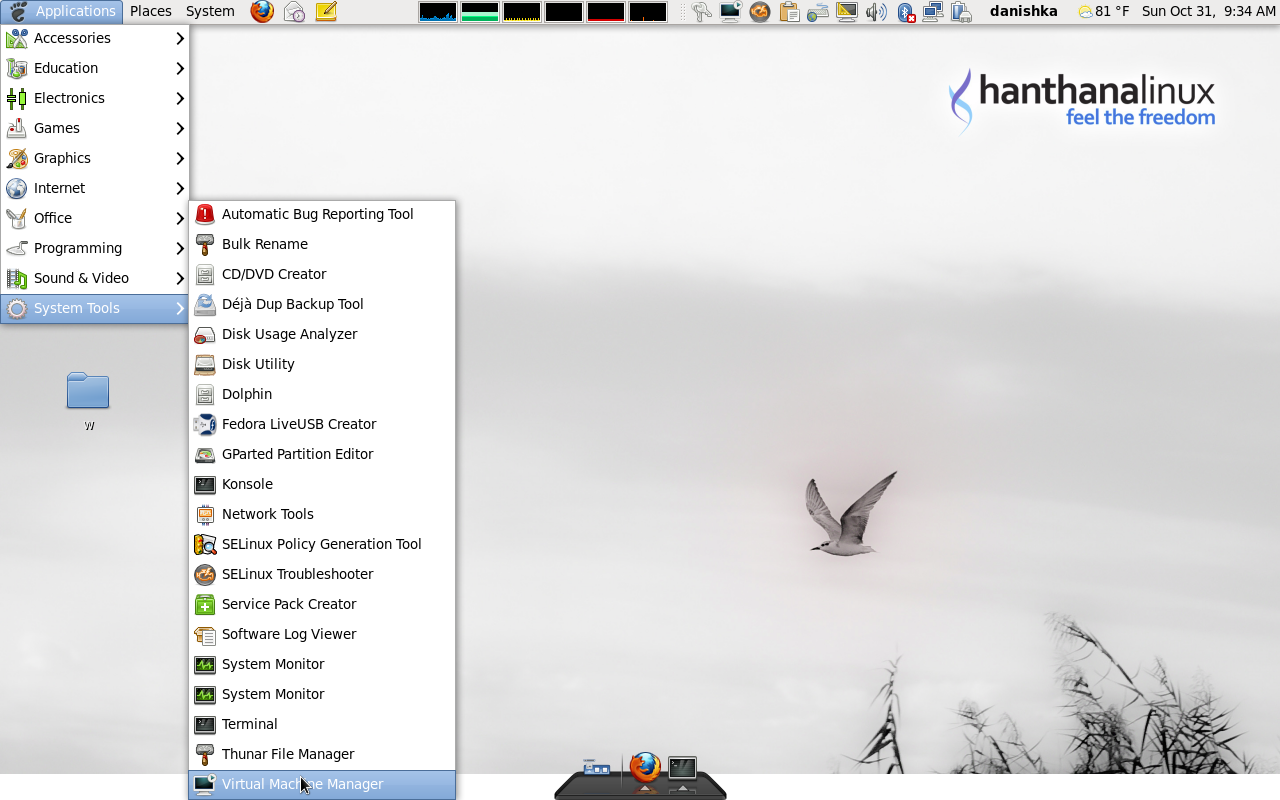
- Developer: Hanthana Community
- OS family: Linux (Unix-like)
- Working state: Current
- Source model: Open source
- Initial release: 19 September 2009
- Latest release: 30 / 27 August 2019; 7 years ago
- Available in: Multilingual
- Update method: Yum (PackageKit)
- Package manager: RPM Package Manager
- Supported platforms: i386, amd64
- Kernel type: Linux (Monolithic-based Hybrid)
- Userland: GNU
- Default user interface: GNOME
- License: Free software licenses (mainly GPL)
- Official website: hanthana.org

Hanthana Linux is a Linux distribution based on Fedora, distributed as free and open source software.

It is specially designed to cater to the needs of Sri Lankan computer users who are unable to access the Internet frequently, with many most-wanted applications built in.

Hanthana is developed by the Sri Lanka–based Hanthana Community.

== History and development process ==
Hanthana is a remix of the Fedora operating system. The original aim of the Hanthana team was to create an easy-to-use Linux desktop with as many useful applications preloaded, as downloading applications over the Internet is not possible for many rural areas of Sri Lanka.

Hanthana's first release was on 19 September 2009. Since then, Hanthana community has released new versions of Hanthana every six months with commitment to support each release for eighteen months by providing security fixes, patches to critical bugs and minor updates to programs. Once a new Fedora version is released, after some time, the corresponding Hanthana version will be released and it contains all the software updates up to the date of release.

Hanthana packages are based on packages from Fedora: both distributions use RedHat's rpm package format and package management tools Yum (PackageKit).

== Features ==
Hanthana is composed of many software packages, of which the majority are distributed under a free software license, making an exception only for some proprietary hardware drivers. The main license used is the GNU General Public License (GNU GPL) which, along with the GNU Lesser General Public License (GNU LGPL), explicitly declares that users are free to run, copy, distribute, study, change, develop and improve the software. On the other hand, there is also proprietary software available that can run on Hanthana. Hanthana focuses on usability, security and stability. Hanthana also emphasizes accessibility and internationalization to reach as many people as possible. From the start UTF-8 is the default character encoding, which allows for support of a variety of non-Roman scripts.

Hanthana comes installed with a wide range of software that includes LibreOffice, Firefox, Pidgin, Transmission, GIMP, and several lightweight games (such as Sudoku and chess).

== Installation ==
Installation of Hanthana is generally performed with the Live DVD. Hanthana can be run directly from the DVD (albeit with a significant performance loss), allowing a user to "test-drive" the OS for hardware compatibility and driver support.

Users can download a disk image (.iso) of the DVD, which can then either be written to a physical medium (DVD), or optionally run directly from a hard drive (via UNetbootin or GRUB).

Following minimum hardware specifications will ensure your work on Hanthana easier and faster:

For text mode recommended processor : 200 MHz Pentium Pro or faster minimum memory (RAM): 256 MB For graphical mode recommended processor : 400 MHz Pentium Pro or faster minimum memory (RAM): 640 MB recommended memory (RAM): 1152 MB Hard disk minimum free space of 15GB A DVD ROM

== Latest Version ==
Hanthana Developer team has announced the release of Hanthana Linux 30 (Vishwa)), a Fedora-based distribution on a 1.9 GB live DVD with a large number of applications, media codecs and custom artwork: "Hanthana Linux 28 (Kandula – Security Edition of Hanthana Linux pre-released) is released.

Hanthana Linux 28 (Kandula – Security Edition of Hanthana Linux), the latest release of Hanthana part of the Hanthana Linux project. In addition to the host of applications, the new release has the official LibreOffice guide provided by The Document Foundation added as well.

Please note there are various desktop editions including GNOME 3, GNOME Sugar, KDE, LXDE, XFCE.

== See also ==
- Linux User Group
- List of Linux distributions
- List of Fedora-based operating systems
- Computer technology for developing areas
