= Kwort Linux =

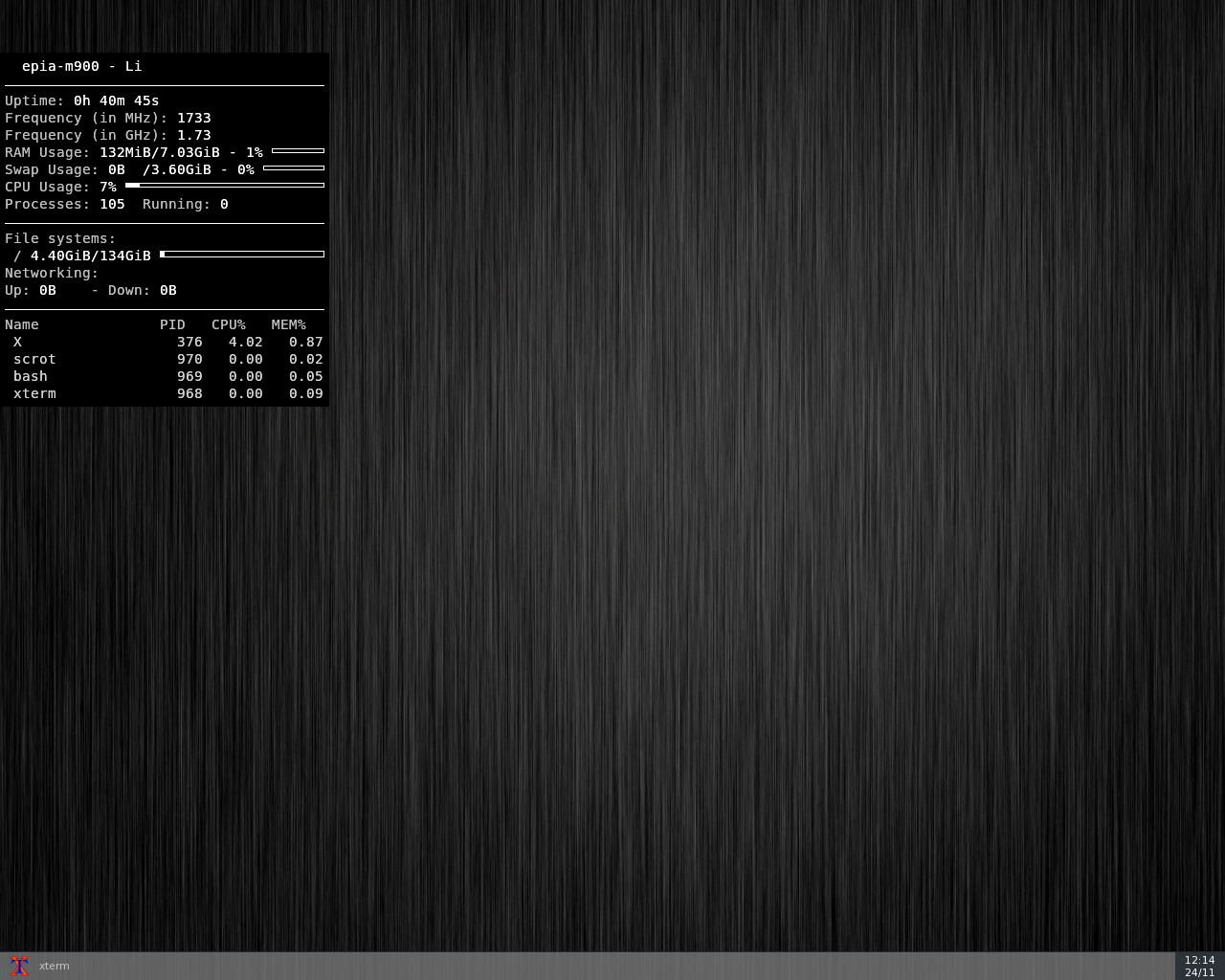
- Kwort Linux 4.3.4
- OS family: Linux (Unix-like)
- Working state: Current
- Source model: Open source
- Initial release: 22 January 2006; 20 years ago
- Latest release: 4.5 / 22 June 2025; 9 months ago
- Package manager: kpkg
- Supported platforms: x86-64
- Default user interface: Openbox
- Official website: kwort.org

Kwort is a Linux distribution, based on CRUX, with the intent of making a distribution that is straight forward and minimal.

== Installation ==
The distribution is available for download as installation-only CD image suitable for x64-based computers. It does not provide installation program. Instead, text-based applications and scripts are used to install and configure the system. Contrary to CRUX Linux, the user doesn't need to compile a new kernel.

== System requirements ==
The system requirements of Kwort are:

- x86-64 processor.
- 512 MB of RAM.
- 1.4 GB free disk space.

== Package manager ==
Kwort Linux uses the kpkg package manager. kpkg can download and install packages from Kwort's or third party repositories and their mirrors.

== Reception ==
Tux Machines reviewed Kwort Linux in March 2006. The review included the following:

Not long after booting the install cd I became aware that Kwort is based on Slackware. They use a slightly simplified Slackware installer. Basically, only the target partition is asked before the install begins and then it installs a base system. After which it asks about your dial-up modem, network configuration, and lilo choices. Upon boot, it walks the user through the configuration of alsa, root password, and a user account before it asks for the install cd again.

Jesse Smith wrote a review of Kwort 4.3 for DistroWatch Weekly:

The installation instructions let us know that we will need to do a bit of manual work to get a fresh copy of Kwort up and running. At times the instructions are sparse and I recommend reading the on-line copy of the installation guide as it fills in some of the blanks. Kwort does not have a system installer and so we find ourselves using command line utilities to partition the hard drive, format disk partitions and mount the areas of the disk where we plan to install the distribution.

== See also ==
- CRUX
- Openbox
