= Platypux =

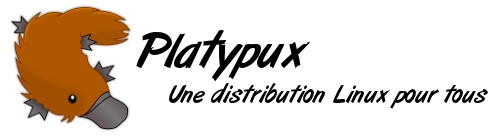

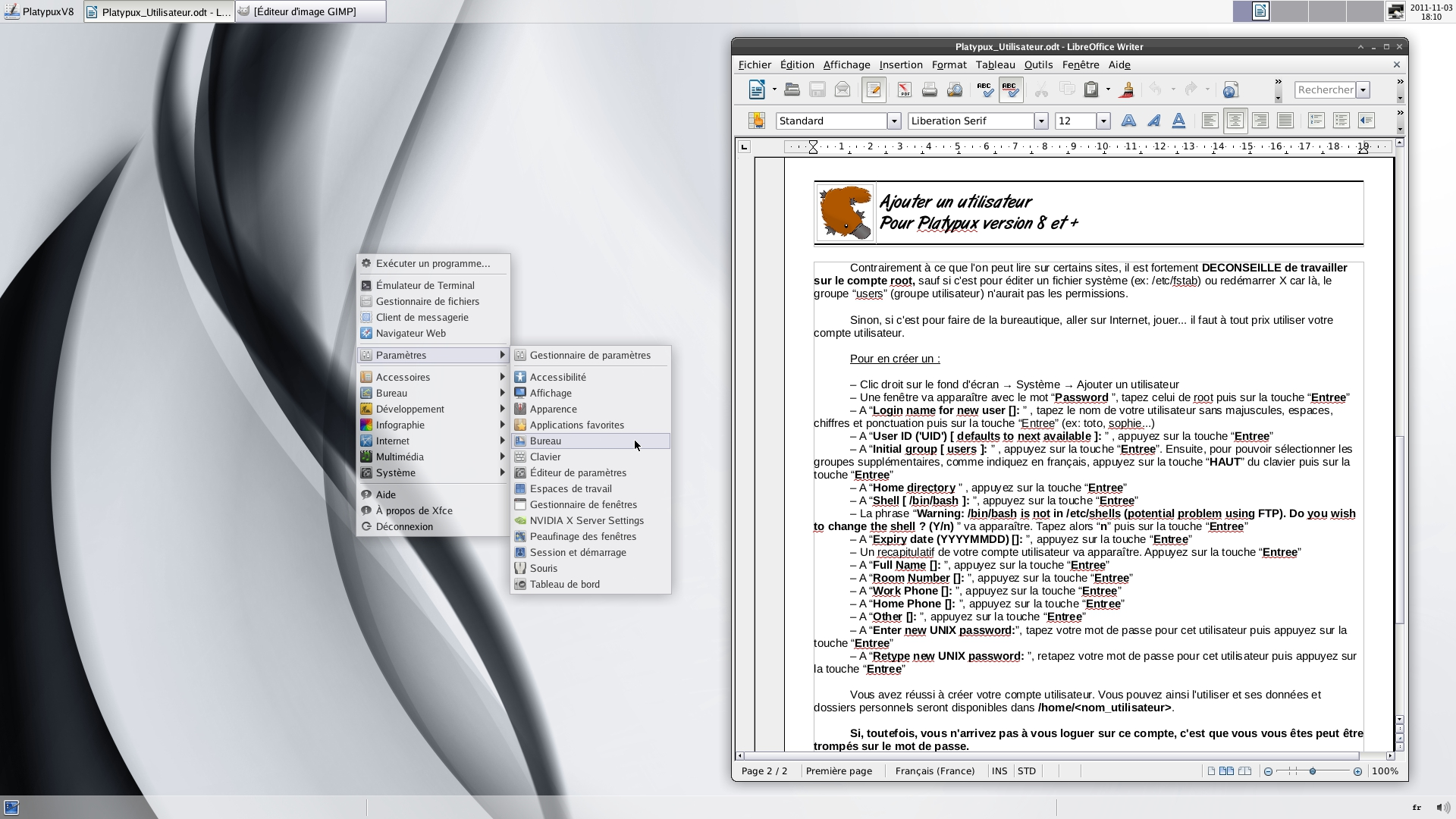
- Platypux V8.0 screenshot
- Developer: Pierre-Aimé and Jacques-Olivier (The Platypux Brothers)
- OS family: Linux (Unix-like)
- Working state: Active
- Source model: Open source
- Latest release: V8.0 / November 9, 2011; 14 years ago
- Update method: Manual, using XZM Packages built with SQUASFHS and AUFS
- Package manager: LZM
- Supported platforms: x86 with PAE support
- Kernel type: Monolithic (Linux kernel)
- Default user interface: Xfce by default instead of Openbox from V8.0 and later
- License: Free software (mainly GPL)
- Official website: platypux.site.free.fr

Platypux was a French Linux distribution of the Slackware family, developed by Pierre-Aimé and Jacques-Olivier.

== History ==
Despite Platypux being a Slackware derivative, it was built using the source code provided by the Linux From Scratch project (LFS) that enables the developers to learn the internal workings of a Linux-based system, in order to build a custom Linux distro, so it can naturally fit its intended audience and purpose.

Platypux V8.0 is only supported by x86 (32bits) platforms, both desktops and laptops, it is available for install from a live-DVD. Its kernel supports PAE in order to enable full access to RAM memory over the 4GiB limit.

== Origin of the name ==
Platypux has been developed using the source code from the Linux From Scratch project, but also counts on source code for BLFS (Beyond Linux From Scratch) and ALFS (Automated Linux From Scratch) Linux distros. The Linux kernel alongside the several preinstalled packages comprehend the Linux distribution.

Platypux is a pun of platypus and tux, the Linux mascot. A platypus is an exotic animal which despite being a mammal shares oviparity with amphibians an others, making it an exotic Linux distro with parts from "penguins", a GNU and other third party components.

== Preinstalled software packages ==
Some of the preinstalled packages for Platypux V8.0 are:

- Xfce Window Manager.
- GIMP image editor (with XSane support)
- Inkscape Scalable Vector Graphics editor.
- SRWare Iron web browser.
- Pidgin instant messaging.
- The LibreOffice suite.

== Versions ==
The release history of Platypux is as follows:

- Version 1.0 released on December 29, 2008. First version, Slackware based.
- V2.0 released on February 20, 2009. Support added for USB flash drive and other removable drives, support for the Wacom tablet and other upgrades.
- V3.0 released on April 19, 2009. Featured Conky and Wifi-radar
- V4.0 released on September 2, 2009. From this version on, WiFi setup is saved on each PC. Java MPlayer 1.0 is introduced.
- V5.0 released on June 13, 2010. System compiled from the LFS and BLFS source code.
- V6.0 released on January 1, 2011. LibreOffice added. Libraries and utilities were updated. Linux 2.6.36 kernel sources are available in the live DVD. Save configuration was improved. WICD is used for network configuration. A package manager was added for building and downloading lzm.
- V7.0 released on May 29, 2011. NFS was corrected, the gFTP client and wireless device firmware was added. Linux kernel 2.6.37.6 added with AUFS and LZMA support. Thunderbird was introduced.
- V8.0 released on November 9, 2011. Several applets added (sound, keyboard, batteries, and others), NVIDIA graphics card support with privative drivers (can be activated thanks to nvidia-xconfig). Added XZM compression for AUFS. XFCE window manager replaces Openbox.
- V9.0 is to be announced, it is under development.

== See also ==
- List of Linux distributions
