= Goobuntu =

Ubuntu derivative that was once used internally within Google

Goobuntu was a Linux distribution based on Ubuntu LTS (long-term support). It was used by almost 10,000 Google employees. It added a number of packages for in-house use, including security features and disabled the installation of some applications, but was otherwise similar. Thomas Bushnell, a Google technical leader for the company's Linux desktops, displayed Goobuntu at LinuxCon 2012. Bushnell said that "Goobuntu is simply a light skin over standard Ubuntu."

Some suggested Google might plan to market the distribution more widely, but Goobuntu was never officially released. While both Google and Mark Shuttleworth, who spearheaded the development of Ubuntu, confirmed the existence of Goobuntu, both denied that Google had any plans to market the operating system.

Mark Shuttleworth confirmed that Google has contributed patches to Ubuntu.

Thomas Bushnell also stated that the only things they were adding were special tools to access Google specific resources that their engineers need and that any apps with known security issues had been removed.

Google used Puppet to manage its installed base of Goobuntu machines.

In 2018, Google replaced Goobuntu with gLinux, a Linux distribution based on Debian Testing.

== See also ==
- Google
- ChromeOS
- List of Linux distributions
- List of Ubuntu-based distributions
