= Cub Linux =

Computer operating system

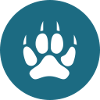

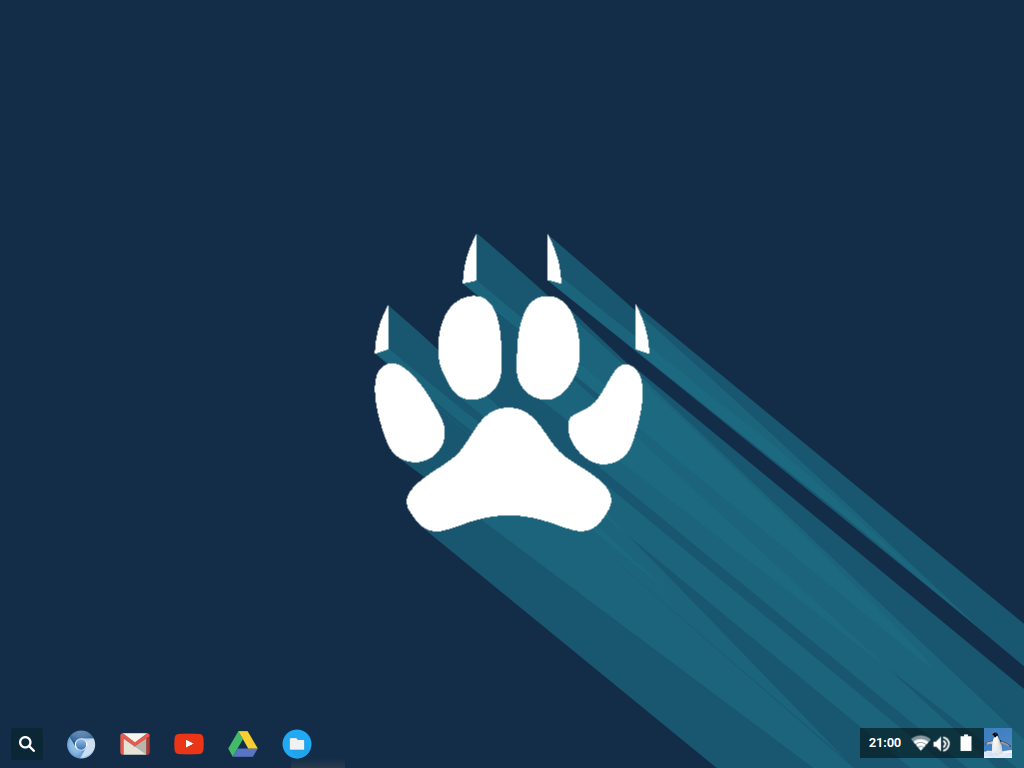
- Cub Linux displaying its desktop
- Developer: RichJack
- Written in: C (core), C++
- OS family: Unix-like (Linux kernel)
- Working state: Discontinued
- Source model: Open source
- Initial release: 1 January 2016; 10 years ago
- Latest release: Chromixium_1.5 / 1 January 2016; 10 years ago
- Marketing target: PC
- Available in: English
- Update method: Unattended-upgrades
- Package manager: dpkg APT Synaptic
- Supported platforms: x86, x86 64
- Kernel type: Monolithic (Linux)
- Userland: GNU
- Default user interface: Openbox
- License: GPL 3.0
- Preceded by: Chromixium OS
- Official website: cublinux.com

Cub Linux was a computer operating system designed to mimic the desktop appearance and functionality of ChromeOS. It was based on Ubuntu Linux LTS 14.04 "Trusty Tahr". It used Openbox as the window manager and tools taken from LXDE, Gnome, XFCE as well as a number of other utilities. It was a cloud-centric operating system that was heavily focused on the Chromium Browser. Cub Linux's tagline was "Cub = Chromium + Ubuntu".

== History ==
Cub Linux was originally called Chromixium OS. The developer, RichJack, initially announced the project on the Ubuntu user forums on September 19, 2014. Since then, the project released the first stable version, Chromixium 1.0 as a 32 bit live ISO on April 26, 2015. This was followed by a service pack to address a number of issues such as screen tearing and slow menu generation. In July 2015, a number of updates were rolled into a new release, version 1.5. This was initially 32 bit only, but was followed by a 64 bit release in November 2015.

At some point towards the end of 2015, Google, who owns the rights to the ChromeOS and Chromium trademarks, requested that RichJack cease use of the Chromixium mark and related websites and social media presences. On January 17, 2016, RichJack announced that Chromixium would be changing name to Cub Linux with immediate effect and that the Chromixium name would be completely dropped by 31 March 2016.

Towards the end of 2016, the Cub Linux website mysteriously disappeared. Their GitHub page is still open. User d4zzy, who was involved in Cub Linux's development had this to say about its sudden end: "Cub was killed due to private life restrictions - that was all and there was no one at the time to pick it up."

On July 19, 2017, Dominic Hayes announced that he would be "bringing back Cub" in the form of Phoenix Linux. Phoenix Linux remained in active development until early 2019, when development stopped due to the success of Feren OS. It remained in limbo until Hayes announced the cancellation of the project in November 2022.

== Receptions ==
Jesse Smith from DistroWatch Weekly reviewed Chromixium OS 1.0:

My point is that people who are likely to enjoy Chromebooks and use their computers almost solely for accessing the web will probably find Chromixium quite useful. However, while it is technically possible to access more features and off-line software through Chromixium's application menu, the process is slow and awkward when compared with other desktop Linux distributions. Granted, Chromixium is still in its early stages, it just hit version 1.0, so the standalone features will probably improve in time. For now, I think Chromixium offers an interesting web-focused environment with the fallback option of using locally installed applications. The implementation has some rough edges at the moment, but I suspect it will get better in future releases.

== See also ==
- SUSE Studio#Notable appliances
- List of Linux distributions#openSUSE-based
- Ubuntu
- ChromeOS
- Chromium Browser
