= MAX (operating system) =

Spanish Linux distribution

MaX
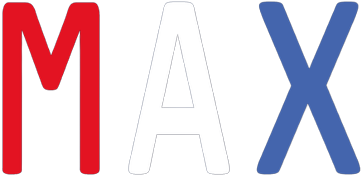

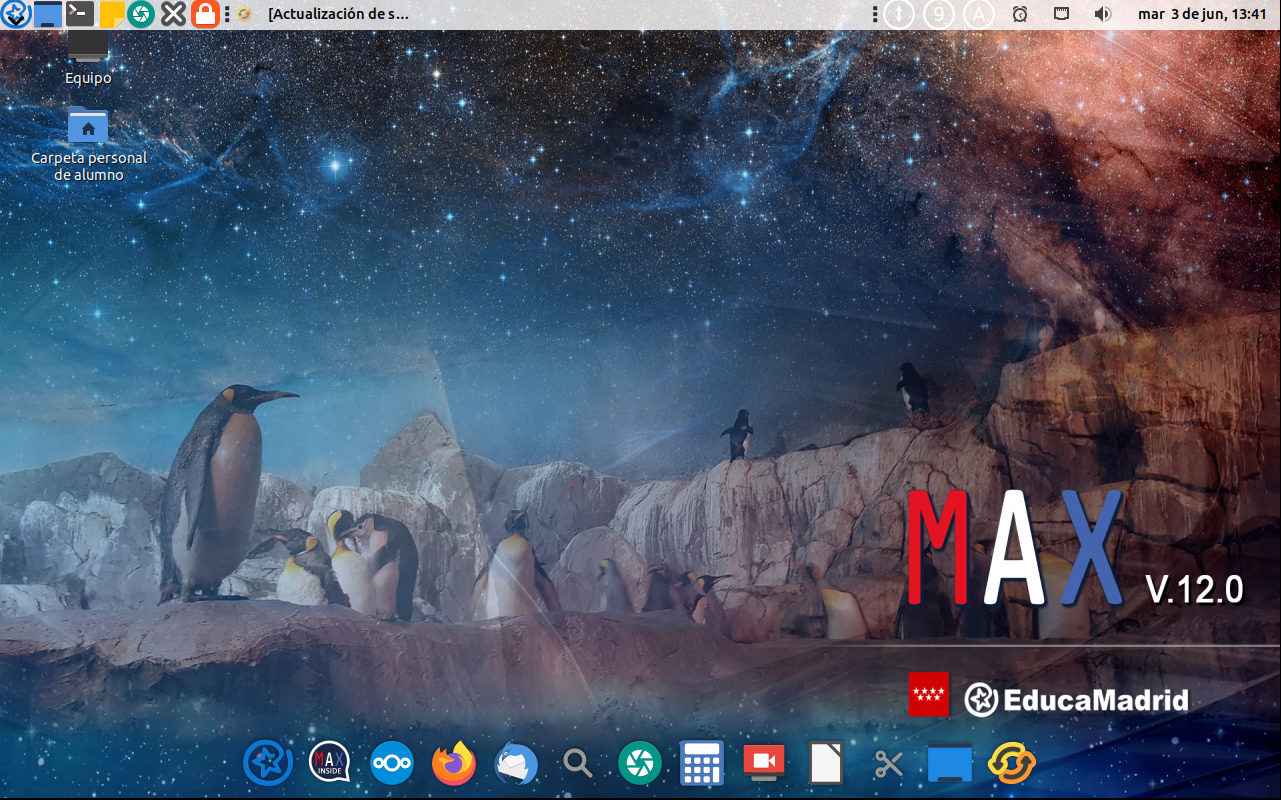
- MaX 12 desktop
- Developer: Community of Madrid
- OS family: Linux
- Working state: Active
- Source model: Free and open-source software
- Initial release: May 27, 2004; 22 years ago
- Latest release: 12.0 / January 1, 2025; 22 months ago
- Repository: Max 12.0
- Available in: Spanish
- Package manager: DEB
- Supported platforms: x86-64
- Kernel type: Monolithic
- Default user interface: MATE
- License: GPL and others
- Official website: www.educa2.madrid.org/web/max/inicio

MaX, also known as Madrid_linux, is a Linux distribution created with funds from the Consejería de Educación, Juventud y Deporte of the Comunidad de Madrid adapted for use in educational environments. The main features of this operating system are simplicity, stability, and a huge collection of software.

== History ==
=== Start ===
MaX started out simply as an educational distribution made for lower performance computers, since most of the computers in the schools of the Comunidad de Madrid had only 32 bits and very little RAM, so they had problems with the main operating systems. Later, more members joined the Max Group and received suggestions for improvements and additions. In 2013 they already had 60 members, including professors of all kinds.

=== Desktop and Support ===
During the first versions of MaX it was used with the KDE desktop environment and only supported 32-bit computers of the i486 architecture, until MaX version 3, where the processor architecture was changed to i386, also 32-bit. In MaX version 4, the desktop environment was changed to GNOME, one of the most widely used in Linux, and in version 5 support for 64-bit computers with x86 64 architecture was added. In version 7, the desktop environment was changed to Xfce. In version 9 the desktop environment was changed again to Mate, and in version 11 support for 32-bit computers ended.

== Activities performed ==
The MaX team has participated in events of schools, such as 'Program-me at IES Clara del Rey, to support new talents; or with IES Príncipe Felipe at MediaLab Prado, to encourage diffusion of MaX.

=== Conferences ===
MaX has held many conferencess over the years, almost annually, to present future versions of MaX, create workshops, or hold install parties. The conference was held online in 2021.

== Characteristics ==
=== Community ===
The community of users participates, tests the system, reports problems, contributes with improvement proposals, helps other users, or shares with their peers the benefits of using this system. In return, MAX works and adapts better to the needs of the teachers and the students.

MaX has its own community forum and a volunteer development group.

=== Included software ===
MaX has learning software such as Scratch and Moodle.

== Launch and support ==
MaX Desktop
Version	Launch	Desktop	Architecture
1.0	2004	N/A	N/A
1.1	May 27, 2004	KDE	i486
1.2	October 16, 2004	KDE	i486
2.0	January 30, 2006	KDE	i486
3.0	March 27, 2007	KDE	i386
4.0	December 27, 2009	GNOME	i386
5.0	January 20, 2010	GNOME	i386, x86_64
6.0	2011	GNOME	i386, x86_64
6.0.1	May 5, 2011	GNOME	i386, x86_64
6.5	N/A	GNOME	i386, x86_64
6.5.1	N/A	GNOME	i386, x86_64
7.0	October 20, 2012	Xfce	i386, x86_64
7.5	May 22, 2014	Xfce	i386, x86_64
7.5.1	June 8, 2015	Xfce	i386, x86_64
8.0	July 28, 2015	Xfce	i386, x86_64
9.0	February 7, 2017	MATE	i386, x86_64
9.5	June 22, 2018	MATE	i386, x86_64
10.0	October 26, 2018	MATE	i386, x86_64
11.0	July 20, 2021	MATE	x86_64
11.5	March 11, 2022	MATE	x86_64
12.0	October 30, 2024	MATE	x86_64
MaX Server (Discontinued)
Version	Launch	Desktop	Architecture
2011	October 16, 2011	GNOME	i386, x86_64
2012	2012	GNOME	x86_64
2014	December 14, 2014	GNOME	x86_64
Color	Significate		
Red	Unsupported version		
Yellow	Older version with support		
Green	Current version		
Blue	Version under development		

=== MaX 9 ===
MaX 9 was released on February 7, 2017, changing its desktop environment for the third time, in this case to Ubuntu Mate (16.04). Not many other changes have been made to the desktop, but there is a noticeable difference in the taskbar.

=== MaX 10 ===
The MaX 10 release, based on Ubuntu Mate (18.04), was released on October 26, 2018. In this version the operating system performance has been greatly improved, although the minimum requirements have been increased compared to the previous build.

=== MaX 11 ===
MaX 11 release was launched on July 20, 2021. with the main purpose of making a redesign to the operating system. Added a Mac style dock at the bottom of the desktop with the most relevant applications, moved the position of the taskbar to the top of the screen, the wallpaper and icons have been redesigned, indicators have been added for NumLock and ShiftLock, and two new menus called Education/STEM and Distance Education have been added.

Added the programs Scratux, MuseScore3, Kdenlive, OBS, Xournal++, Phet, Step, eXeLearning 2.6. This version is only compatible with modern computers, as it no longer supports 32-bit computers, and its minimum requirements have been raised.

=== MaX 12 ===
MaX 12 was released on 30 October 2024. Its based in Ubuntu 22.04 and includes Linux kernel (6.8.0-40) improving compatibility with newer devices. In this release Max celebrates its 20th Anniversary

Main menu redesign.

Updated versions of installed programs.

Integration of Whisper artificial intelligence into Kdenlive for automatic offline subtitle generation.

OER creation with the latest version of eXeLearning (2.9), which includes five MAX and EducaMadrid-specific styles, in addition to the Digital Competence Portfolio for Teachers and the "Creatum project" style.

New MAX PDF application that integrates multiple features for processing PDF files offline.

Customized desktop client for the EducaMadrid Cloud.

Easy local metadata deletion.

New "Robotics and Programming" menu adapted for the development of the Código Escuela 4.0 program.

== See also ==
- Portal:Linux
- Ubuntu based distributions
