= Linux Caixa Mágica =

Portuguese Linux distribution based on Ubuntu

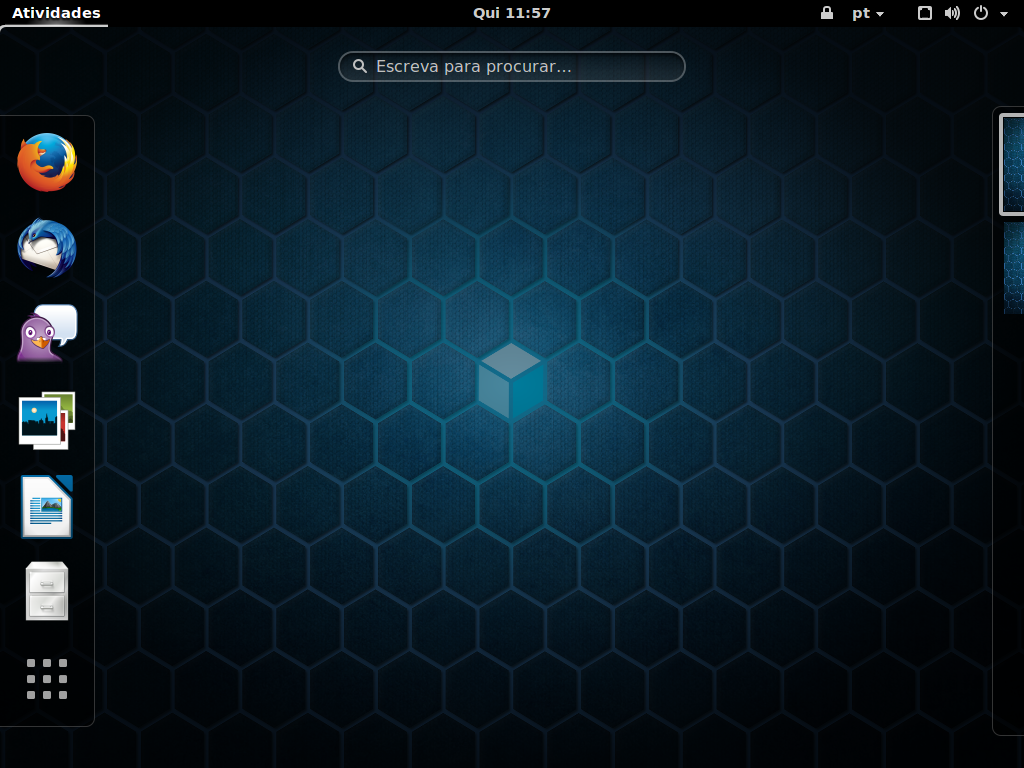
- Linux Caixa Mágica 23
- Developer: Caixa Mágica Software
- OS family: Linux (Debian/Ubuntu-based)
- Working state: Active
- Source model: Open source
- Supported platforms: x86-64, IA-32
- Kernel type: Monolithic (Linux)
- Default user interface: GNOME, LXQt (Lite version)
- License: GNU GPL / Various
- Official website: caixamagica.pt/linux-caixa-magica/

Linux Caixa Mágica (sometimes abbreviated as Caixa Mágica, Linux CM or CM) is an open-source operating system managed by the company Caixa Mágica Software. It is a Portuguese distribution of the Linux operating system based on the Debian distribution. It is aimed at businesses, individuals, education, and public administration. It was created in October 2000 with the awarding of the Prémio Milénio Expresso 2000 to three researchers from the Association for the Development of Telecommunications and Informatics|Association for the Development of Telecommunications and Informatics (ADETTI): Daniel Neves, José Guimarães and Paulo Trezentos. The free version of Linux Caixa Mágica is available online on the official website and through mirrors, without any support and only with access to documentation created by the user community. The paid version includes a DVD copy, access to the online manual, and phone/email support.

In 2020, the project was revitalized with the launch of the Lite Linux Caixa Mágica version, focused on digital inclusion and the reuse of hardware in the context of the COVID-19 pandemic.

== Versions and distribution ==
There are several versions and distribution methods for Linux Caixa Mágica. Free versions without support are distributed on the company's server and other mirrors, typically from educational institutions in Portugal. The paid version includes phone and email support provided by the company Caixa Mágica Software. This version also includes a DVD copy and additional benefits such as discounts on company training sessions. Digital distributions (online) are available in .iso format via http and ftp protocols.

=== Free versions ===
"Linux Caixa Mágica DVD (32-bit)", "Linux Caixa Mágica DVD (64-bit)", "Linux Caixa Mágica – Live CD Gnome" and "Linux Caixa Mágica – Live CD KDE" are free and available online on the official site and mirrors. These versions do not have phone or email support or a user manual, except for those created by the community.

=== Paid support version ===
"Linux Caixa Mágica Pro" is available for a fee and can be downloaded online from the company's servers. The DVD is delivered by mail or purchased in stores through Porto Editora distribution channels. This version includes telephone and online support. The manual is only available online in a restricted area for customers of this version (and other specific cases), called the "Knowledge Network" (Rede de Conhecimento – RdC).

=== Version for the Magalhães ===
"Linux Caixa Mágica Mag" (Linux Caixa Mágica Magalhães, Linux CM E-Escolas, CmMag or CM Magalhães) is based on Linux Caixa Mágica and was created specifically to be incorporated into the Magalhães laptops aimed at children. It is distributed for free on DVD by J.P. Sá Couto only to primary schools for installation on the laptops. It is also factory-included on the laptops in dual boot with Microsoft Windows XP Home or, in some cases, Microsoft Windows XP Professional. Magalhães laptops sold to the public in stores include Caixa Mágica Mag and Windows 7 Ultimate.

=== Ministry of Justice version ===
"Linius CM" is the operating system based on Linux Caixa Mágica, adapted for the Portuguese Ministry of Justice. It is available on the Ministry of Justice's Linius website..

=== Lite Linux Caixa Mágica ===
Launched in 2020, this version emerged as a response to the remote work and study needs resulting from the COVID-19 pandemic. The system was optimized for use on **refurbished equipment**, aiming to reduce electronic waste and facilitate technological access for families with fewer resources. It includes dozens of open-source applications for productivity, videoconferencing, and browsing. Caixa Mágica Software. "Linux Caixa Mágica – Open Source Solutions".

=== Source code ===
The source code of the operating system is available online through a Subversion server from Caixa Mágica Software.

== Programs ==
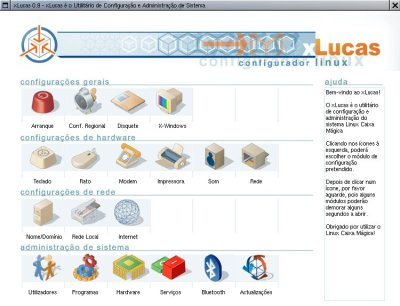
Screenshot of "xLucas", a configuration and installation utility for Linux Caixa Mágica

Linux Caixa Mágica is accompanied by about 5,000 programs, totaling 4 GB. Not all of these programs are available in the Linux Caixa Mágica Mag version, which contains other programs directed at children.

The main programs, in the Portuguese language, are:

- OpenOffice / LibreOffice
- Firefox
- GIMP
- KView
- Kopete
- Thunderbird
- aMule
- KNode
- K3b
- KsCD
- KMix
- amaroK
- Kaffeine
- Evaristo

== Usage ==
Organizations and companies that fully or partially use Linux Caixa Mágica:

- Barcelos City Council.
- J.P. Sá Couto – since September 2008, it has included Linux Caixa Mágica Mag since the launch of the Magalhães laptops it produces for children, except for those sold to the public in stores.
- Portuguese secondary schools, in classrooms for the Information and Communication Technologies (ICT) subject taught to 9th and 10th-grade students. Linux Caixa Mágica Desktop 8.1 Pro was installed on approximately 13,000 computers in dual boot with Microsoft Windows XP, except for classroom servers which use only Microsoft Windows Server 2003. Installation was achieved through a protocol between the Ministry of Education and Sun Microsystems, which in turn signed a memorandum of understanding with Caixa Mágica Software.
- Portuguese Ministry of Justice – specific version of Linux Caixa Mágica.
- On 28 January 2008, it was integrated into the laptop offering of the e-escola program, through a partnership with TMN and Fujitsu Siemens. It was also integrated into InSYS laptops from Inforlândia.

== Release history ==
Release Date	Name	Notes
31 July 2002	Caixa Mágica 8.01 (desktop)	
6/7 October 2003	Linux Caixa Mágica Server 8.1	
14 March 2004	Linux Caixa Mágica Desktop Pro 8.1	With CD, DVD, manual, and phone/email support, it cost €78 in 2004. It was the first version distributed in stores via a partnership with Porto Editora.
26 March 2004	Linux Caixa Mágica Desktop 8.1	
23 October 2003	Linux@PME 8.1	Version based on "Linux Caixa Mágica Server 8.1", aimed at Small and Medium Enterprises, available for payment (€105 in 2003). Not available online, only as a box set.
4 April 2005	Linux Caixa Mágica Desktop Pro 10	
14 April 2005	Linux Caixa Mágica Desktop 10	Developed by 10 engineers over 6 months.
Sept/Oct 2005	Linius CM 2005 (desktop)	Version for the Portuguese Ministry of Justice.
26 January 2006	Linux Caixa Mágica Desktop 10 Live CD	
1 February 2006	Linux Caixa Mágica Server 10 Pro	Marketed at €129 at launch.
13 February 2006	Linux Caixa Mágica Server 10	
	Linius CM 2006	
16 November 2006	Linux Caixa Mágica 11 Pro	Paid version (€99 at launch). First release integrating desktop and server into one. Available in Portuguese and English.
19 December 2006	Linux Caixa Mágica 11	
1 February 2007	Linux Caixa Mágica 11 Live CD (32-bit)	
5 February 2008	Linux Caixa Mágica 12 DVD (32-bit)	Switched base from OpenSUSE to Mandriva Linux. No native software RAID support.
	Linux Caixa Mágica 12 DVD (64-bit)	
	Linux Caixa Mágica 12 Pro	
4 June 2008	Linux Caixa Mágica 12 – Live CD Gnome; Linux Caixa Mágica 12 – Live CD KDE	
September 2008	Linux Caixa Mágica Mag 12	Version based on "CM 12" for the Magalhães laptop.
3 June 2009	Linux Caixa Mágica 14	
1 August 2010	Linux Caixa Mágica 15	
2 July 2011	Linux Caixa Mágica 16	First version of Caixa Mágica with a Debian base.
6 December 2011	Linux Caixa Mágica 17	Available in 32 and 64-bit.
28 May 2012	Linux Caixa Mágica 18	LTS (Long Term support) version with 5 years of security updates.
7 May 2013	Linux Caixa Mágica 19	Featured Gnome 3.6, LibreOffice 3.6.2, and Citizen Card software.
5 June 2013	Linux Caixa Mágica 20	
4 March 2014	Linux Caixa Mágica 21	Features Google Drive/Dropbox synchronization and new Gnome interface.
4 August 2014	Linux Caixa Mágica 22 LTS	Includes Meo Cloud sync and Gnome Flashback/Classic interfaces.
10 April 2015	Linux Caixa Mágica 23	Featured Gnome Shell interface.
June 2020	Lite Linux Caixa Mágica (LLCM)	Based on Lubuntu 20.04 LTS. Developed for remote learning and older hardware.

== Requirements ==
	Desktop and Laptop		Server
	Minimum	Recommended	Server
Processor	Pentium II @ 350 MHz		
RAM	64 MB	128 MB	
Hard Drive (capacity)	4 GB		
Video card (resolution)			
Other requirements	DVD Drive		

== See also ==
- Caixa Mágica Software
- Linux
- List of Linux distributions
- Comparison of Linux distributions
