= Linux XP =

Shareware Linux distribution

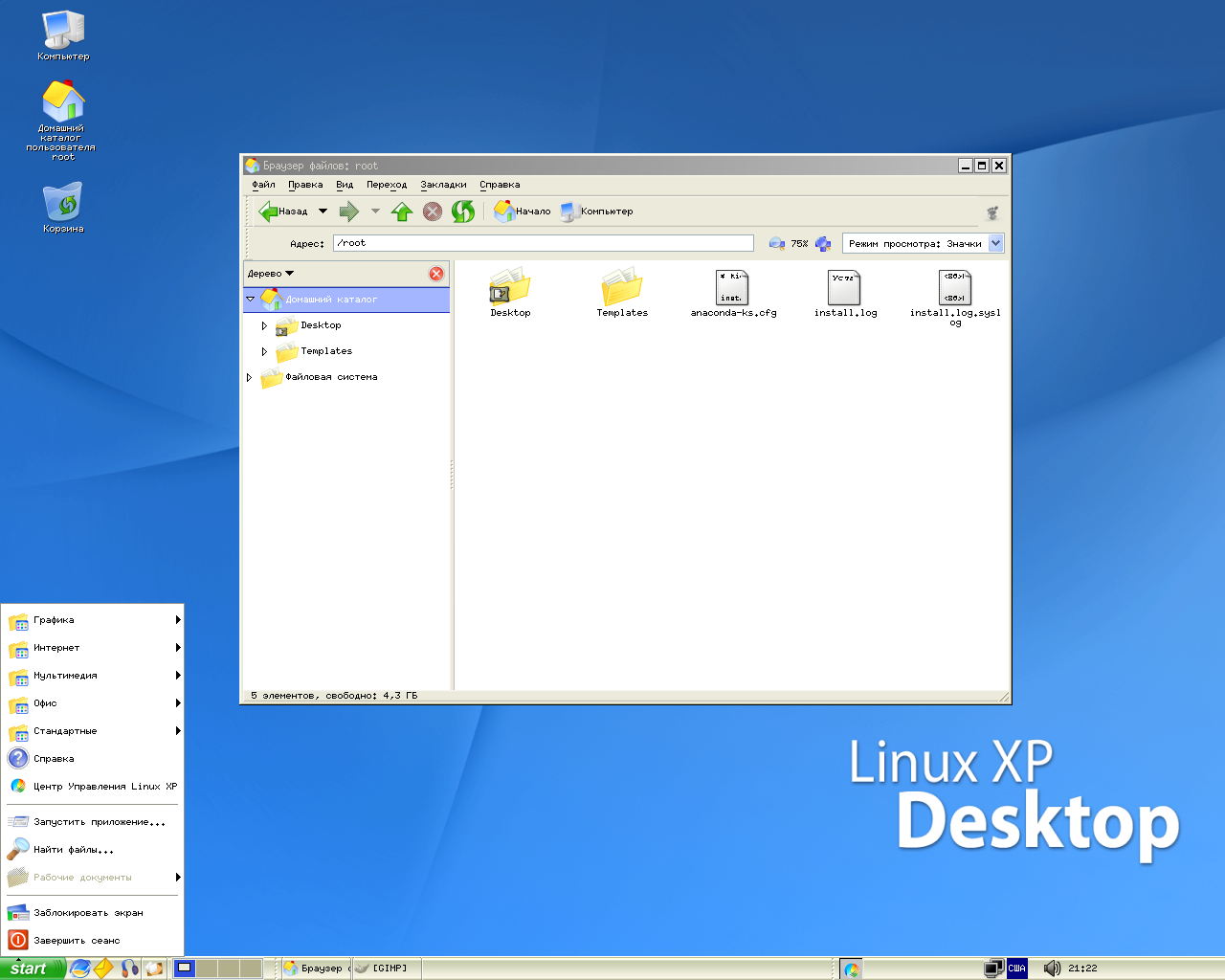
- Linux XP 2006 SR 2 showing start menu and file manager
- Developer: TrustVerse
- OS family: Unix-like (Linux)
- Working state: Discontinued
- Source model: Open source (and proprietary software)
- Initial release: 2004; 22 years ago
- Latest release: 2010 / 2010; 16 years ago
- Available in: Russian
- Package manager: RPM
- Supported platforms: i386
- Kernel type: Monolithic (Linux)
- Default user interface: GNOME 2, Openbox
- License: EULA (demoware), GNU GPL and other licenses
- Official website: www.trustverse.ru

Linux XP was a Fedora Linux-based shareware Linux distribution designed to imitate Windows environment using GNOME desktop; it could run some Microsoft Windows programs using the Wine compatibility layer. Linux XP had to be registered within 99 startups after installation, or the OS would deactivate.

== Distributions ==
The product line included:

- Linux XP SMB Desktop — a distribution for installation on a workstation with a pre-installed suite of programs for organizing an office workstation (February 2010);
- Linux XP Desktop 2008 Secure Edition — a FSTEC-certified distribution for organizing workstations for processing personal data (October 2009);
- Linux XP SMB Live — a distribution for creating diskless workstations;
- Linux XP Small is a compact distribution for creating embedded solutions based on Linux XP SMB Desktop (February 2010);
- Linux XP SMB Server is a distribution for creating an effective server with centralized user management, WEB-mail and group work tools, a built-in terminal server, virtualization system, etc. (February 2010).

== License ==
To legally use Linux XP SMB Desktop, Linux XP Desktop Secure Edition required registration, which required purchasing a license and registering the product serial number. Linux XP Desktop had a trial period of 30 days, during which you could use the installed operating system without registering a serial number. A registered user received technical support for 1 year.

Paid use:

- Linux XP SMB Desktop — $13.95;
- Linux XP Desktop 2008 — $40.67;
- Linux XP Server Edition — $81.35.

== Main components Linux XP Desktop ==
The following set of applications is included in the standard delivery of Linux XP Desktop:

- Office Suite OpenOffice.org
- Mail client Evolution
- Web Browser Mozilla Firefox
- Graphics editor GIMP
- Vector Graphics Editor Inkscape
- Layout and preparation of publications — Scribus
- The Internet pager (ICQ, MSN, Jabber and other protocols) Pidgin
- Implementation of the runtime environment Windows — Wine
- Service LIS
- Migrator
- Programs for working with audio and video files (Rhythmbox, Totem, audio grabber)
- CD and DVD burning software— Brasero
- Remote access to the desktop (Windows and Linux computers)
- Project management Planner
- A program for watching TV programs kdetv
- Multiple games
- Software Development Applications
- Virtual machine VirtualBox

== Windows Compatibility ==
A commercial implementation was supplied as part of the Linux XP SMB Desktop Wine — WINE-LXP — with extended support for running Windows applications.

The Linux XP distribution provided users with the ability to process office documents in DOC, DOCX, XLS, XLSX and other popular document formats used in Microsoft Windows, using the built-in functions of the supplied software (OpenOffice.org, GIMP and so on).

== See also ==
- Linux adoption
- Windows XP
- Fedora
- ReactOS
