= Tomsrtbt =

Linux distribution

Tom's Root Boot (tomsrtbt)
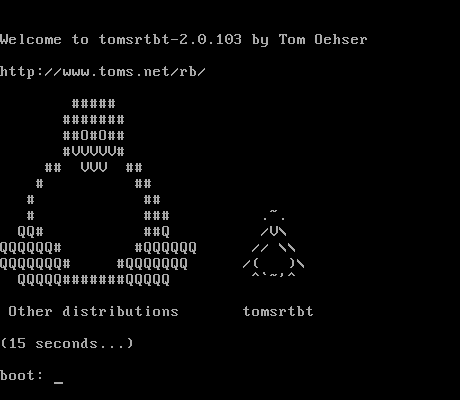
- Tom's Root Boot bootloader
- Developer: Tom Oehser
- OS family: Linux (Unix-like)
- Working state: Defunct / Unmaintained
- Source model: Open source
- Latest release: 2.0.103 / May 4, 2002; 24 years ago
- Official website: http://www.toms.net/rb

tomsrtbt (pronounced: Tom's Root Boot) is a very small Linux distribution. It is short for "Tom's floppy which has a root filesystem and is also bootable." Its author, Tom Oehser, touts it as "The most GNU/Linux on one floppy disk", containing many common Linux command-line tools useful for system recovery (Linux and other operating systems.) It also features drivers for many types of hardware, and network connectivity.

It could be created from within Linux or earlier versions of Windows running in MS-DOS mode, either by formatting a standard 1440 KiB (1.44 MB) floppy disk as a higher-density 1722 KiB (1.722 MB) disk and writing the tomsrtbt image to the disk, or by burning it as a bootable CD. It is capable of reading and writing the filesystems of many operating systems of its era, including ext2/ext3 (used in Linux), FAT (used by MS-DOS and Windows), NTFS (used in Windows NT, 2000, and XP) and Minix (used by the Minix operating system).

Windows NT and most later versions of Windows, including 2000, XP, and Vista, cannot create a tomsrtbt floppy as their floppy driver does not allow the extended format.

A few of the utilities on tomsrtbt are written in the Lua programming language, and many more use BusyBox. Space saving compiler options were used throughout, the kernel was patched to support loading an image compressed with Bzip2, and in many cases older or alternate versions of programs were selected due to their smaller size.

== See also ==
- Lightweight Linux distribution
