= Uruk GNU/Linux =

Uruk GNU/Linux-libre
- Developer: Uruk Project developers
- OS family: Unix-like (Linux kernel)
- Working state: Current
- Source model: Open source
- Initial release: 13 April 2016 (10 years ago)
- Latest release: Uruk GNU/Linux-libre 3.0 / 25 November 2022 (3 years ago)
- Update method: long term support
- Package manager: apt; GNU Guix, urpmi, pacman, dnf in package manager simulator
- Supported platforms: amd64
- Kernel type: Monolithic (Linux-libre)
- Userland: GNU
- Default user interface: MATE
- License: FSDG
- Official website: urukproject.org/dist/en.html

Uruk GNU/Linux-libre is a PureOS-based Linux distribution. The name Uruk is an Iraqi city that states its Iraqi origin. Uruk GNU/Linux 1.0 was released on 13 April 2016 and it ships with the most common software for popular tasks.

== Features ==
Uruk uses Linux-libre kernel for the system and MATE desktop environment for its graphical interfaces.

One of the special features of Uruk is the ability to run various types of package managers at ease (including GNU Guix, urpmi, pacman, dnf). It implements simple one-line command to do that, that use a program named Package Managers Simulator to simulate the commands of popular package managers.

== Version history ==
Version	Date	Kernel version	Desktop environment
1.0	13.04.2016	4.2	MATE
2.0	05.12.2017	4.9.66	MATE, Xfce
3.0	25.11.2022	5.15	MATE

== See also ==
- Parabola GNU/Linux-libre
- Linux-libre
