= Molinux =

Spanish Linux distribution

- OS family: Linux (Unix-like)
- Source model: Open source
- Latest release: 6.2 / December 28, 2010
- License: Various
- Official website: www.bilib.es/molinux/

Molinux was an operating system based on Ubuntu sponsored by the autonomous community of Castilla-La Mancha and the Fundación Ínsula Barataria.

The name "Molinux" derives from the Spanish word molino, meaning "mill" or "windmill". Each version of Molinux is named after a character from the classic Spanish novel Don Quixote, by Miguel de Cervantes.

== Project information ==
Molinux was an initiative begun in 2005 by the government of Castilla-La Mancha to introduce the Castile-La Mancha community to the forefront of the Information Society. The Molinux project is intended to attack the digital divide by reducing the cost of software and offering an easy-to-use operating system.

The sponsoring regional government's commitment to the open source philosophy is such that they have committed not to impose the use of Molinux. "The advantage is that the software is free to compete with anyone, and the user can choose between using this or any other software."

== Latest version ==
Molinux 6.2 (codename "Merlín") was launched on 2010-12-24. It was based on Ubuntu 10.10.

=== Main features ===
- Based on Ubuntu "Lucid" 10.04
- Linux kernel 2.6.32
- GNOME 2.30
- OpenOffice.org 3.2
- Mozilla Firefox 3.6
- X.Org Server 1.7
- The distribution's artistic team has delivered new desktop backgrounds depicting images from the autonomous community and some abstract designs, as well as brand new icons for the panels, menus and desktop. An interesting new feature is a new backup manager that automates backing up of data to external devices or over the local network.
