= Prevas =

Swedish information technology company

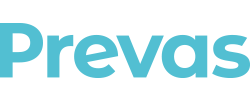
- Company type: Private
- Industry: Embedded systems, Industrial IT
- Founded: 1985
- Headquarters: Västerås, Sweden
- Products: Prevas Industrial Linux

Prevas is a Swedish IT company that provides services to streamline or automate software and hardware. Prevas was founded in 1985 and specialises in product development, embedded systems, industrial IT, and automation. Prevas is certified to be standard with ISO 9001.

Prevas is a supplier and development partner for companies in industries such as life science, telecom, automotive, defense, energy and engineering. Prevas has offices in Sweden, Denmark, Norway, India, and Finland. The company has around 1,100 employees. Prevas has been listed on the NASDAQ exchange in Stockholm since 1998.

Prevas has won first prize in the sv:Swedish Embedded Award in the Enterprise category four times:

- A communications system, built with Interspiro in 2009, that is used in rescue operations.
- A liquid analyser for liquids such as cow or breast milk, built with Miris Holdings in 2012.
- A wireless breathalyzer which provides capabilities for helping alcoholics during the period after leaving rehab centres, built with Kontigo Care in 2014.
- Wireless technology-enabled manikins to aid with CPR training, built with Ambu.

== Selected Products ==
=== Prevas Industrial Linux ===
An off-the-shelf embedded Linux platform for industrial use on custom hardware boards, with support for full customization and long-term maintenance. Prevas Industrial Linux is provided with the OE-lite Linux or Yocto Project integration tools. Prevas has been involved in the development of many OE-lite Linux integration tools.
