= GLinux =

Debian-based Linux distribution which replaced Goobuntu

gLinux is a Debian Testing-based Linux distribution used at Google as a workstation operating system. The Google gLinux team builds the system from source code, introducing their own changes. gLinux replaced the previously used Ubuntu-based distribution, Goobuntu. gLinux is usually installed by loading into a bootstrap environment when it is first booted.

== History ==
When it is started, the root files are unpacked and the Debian installer starts to perform the installation. According to a former user of the OS, it uses the Cinnamon desktop environment.

Over the years, Google has focused on speed, scale and data, which is the thought process that allowed them to move to gLinux. Google used Ubuntu before switching to gLinux; however, the two years of security updates it provided meant that planning for the next upgrade would take close to a year.
