= Russian Fedora Remix =

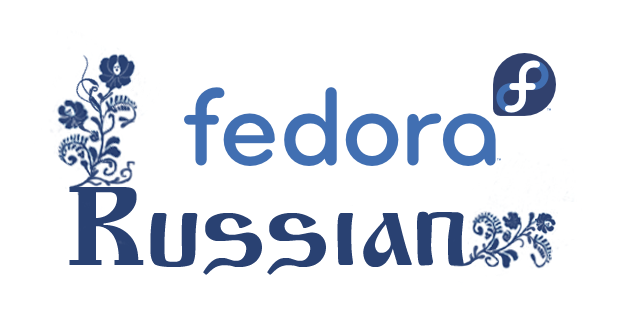
- Official logo of the RFRemix
- Developer: Russian Fedora Project
- OS family: Linux (Unix-like)
- Working state: Discontinued
- Source model: Open source
- Initial release: 20 November 2008; 17 years ago
- Final release: 23 / 3 November 2015; 10 years ago
- Available in: Russian, English
- Update method: DNF (PackageKit)
- Package manager: RPM Package Manager
- Supported platforms: x86, x86-64
- Kernel type: Monolithic (Linux kernel)
- Default user interface: GNOME
- License: Free software licenses, mainly GPL
- Preceded by: Fedora 2008
- Succeeded by: Fedora 2020
- Official website: ru.fedoracommunity.org

Russian Fedora Remix was a remix of the Fedora Linux Linux distribution adapted for Russia that was active from 2008–2019. It was neither a copy of the original Fedora nor a new Linux distribution. The project aimed to ensure that Fedora fully satisfied the needs of Russian users with many additional features provided out of the box (e.g., specific software packages, preinstalled drivers for popular graphics processors, manuals in Russian). In autumn 2019 the project was phased out because its leaders announced that it "had fulfilled its purpose by 100%" and all of the Russian-centric improvements were officially included in Fedora repositories, and Russian Fedora software maintainers became regular Fedora maintainers.

== History ==
The project was originally established by Arkady "Tigro" Shain under the name Tedora. The main inspiration for this was Fedora 9 being very inconvenient for Russian users with a bug impeding successful installation when the packages were customized.

The project's official status was announced at a conference held in the National Research Nuclear University MEPhI (Moscow Engineering Physics Institute) on 20 November 2008. That day Tedora merged into the newly established Russian Fedora founded by Fedora Project, Red Hat, VDEL, and VNIINS. The latter is now the project's technological center.

Starting with version 11, the project name was changed to Russian Fedora Remix to comply with Fedora's regulations regarding use of its trademark.

The project's logo was established on 10 March 2010.

== Releases ==
Release	Date	Status
Tedora 9 final	1 July 2008	released
Tedora 9.1	30 September 2008	released
Russian Fedora 10 final	25 November 2008	released
Russian Fedora 10.1	24 February 2009	released
Russian Fedora 10.2	14 May 2009	released
Russian Fedora Remix 11 final	9 June 2009	released
Russian Fedora Remix 12 final	17 November 2009	released
Russian Fedora Remix 13 final	25 May 2010	released

New versions were planned to be released simultaneously with Fedora ones.

=== Tedora 9 ===
The following are the general differences from Fedora 9:

- The first release of Fedora 9 contained the bug which impeded the successful installation in the Russian language if the packages were customized. This problem was due to an error in the Russian translation of the Fedora installer Anaconda. The error also occurred during the installation in the text mode after the packages had been selected. Both bugs were fixed in Tedora.
- SELinux was disabled by default.
- Support introduced for ReiserFS, ext4, and Journaled File System (JFS).
- Tedora was distributed with the patched loader Grub to allow booting the system installed on ext4.
- The installation disk included GNOME Desktop Environment, K Desktop Environment, XFCE Desktop Environment and IceWM Window Manager.
- The repositories Fedora Updates, Livna, Tigro and Tigro Non-Free were used.
- During the network installation the Tedora repository should have been used instead of the Fedora repository in order to receive the packages. This was due to the changed name of the distribution. For other repositories the tick in the package selection window was sufficient.
- The font loader was added to the file /etc/rc.sysinit which solved the problem with the incorrect rendering of the starting phrase "udev".
- Only European languages were included on the installation disk.
- The keyboard layout "English (US)" is default for the Russian and Ukrainian versions. This allowed the easy creation of a new user profile during the first start of the system.
- The packages could be installed directly from the installation DVD.
- The keys of the Livna and Tigro repositories were automatically imported to PackageKit during the installation.
- There were many programs in Tedora which were not included on the original Fedora DVD. Some notable ones are: XFCE desktop environment; window managers IceWM and Fluxbox; full support of mp3, DVD, DivX and other US-problematic codecs; Flash-plugin which worked "out of the box" even under x86-64; Opera browser; VLC player; Compiz Fusion and Nvidia drivers.
- In Tedora all fonts were rendered as they should. Some additional TrueType fonts were also added.

=== Russian Fedora 10 ===
Russian Fedora 10 was released on 25 November 2008. The following are the main differences from Fedora 10:

- Support of all popular audio and video codecs. Many proprietary video card drivers were also supported.
- XFCE, LXDE and IceWM were available from the installation medium.
- SELinux was set to the Permissive mode by default.
- RPM Fusion and Tigro repositories were used by default.
- Different base installation modes were added: GNOME Desktop, KDE Desktop, XFCE Desktop, etc..
- Package installation from the medium.
- KDM was used instead of GDM in case of KDE being the only installed desktop environment.

=== Russian Fedora 10.1 ===
Russian Fedora 10.1 was released on 24 February 2009. Improvements:

- Problems when switching the keyboard layout were fixed. Layout indicators were added to GNOME and KDE.
- PackageKit allowed to install/uninstall programs from the installation disk without the internet access.
- Folders were opened in the same window in Nautilus.
- Accelerators of the GNOME Terminal menu were disabled.
- The Tigro repository had been replaced with the Russian Fedora repository.
- System installation bugs were fixed.

=== Russian Fedora 10.2 ===
Russian Fedora 10.2 was released on 14 May 2009. The differences from the previous release are updated software and bug fixes.

=== Russian Fedora Remix 11 ===
Russian Fedora Remix 11 was released on the same day as Fedora 11, 9 June 2009. The distribution was available on various media: installation DVD, LiveCD (KDE, GNOME, or Xfce) and LiveDVD (KDE, GNOME, Xfce, and LXDE). Two architectures were supported: P5 (i586) and x86-64.

Differences from Fedora 11:

- The installation DVD contained only languages used in Europe and the Post-Soviet states.
- Many keyboard layout switching improvements.
- Multimedia codecs, network adapter drivers and NVidia graphic card drivers were added.

=== Russian Fedora Remix 12 ===
Russian Fedora Remix 12 was released on 17 November 2009. As a result of the adoption of the new compression algorithm (XZ, the new LZMA format) the installation DVD contained more packages compared to previous versions. All languages of the original Fedora were included on this DVD.

=== Russian Fedora Remix 13 ===
The release of RFRemix 13 came out on 25 May 2010.

Apart from the usual set of changes like added multimedia codecs or additional desktop environments, RFRemix 13 has introduced the following features into Fedora 13 (only notable ones are listed):

- Firstboot contains the special screen for changing some system preferences, for example, disabling IPv6, enabling ctrl+alt+backspace, choosing the login manager, and others.
- The feature of setting up different key combinations for switching the keyboard layout for the Russian language.
- Use of Firefox 3.6.4 pre build4 which is believed more stable than version 3.6.4.
- SELinux set by default to Enforcing mode.
- Updated Russian Fedora logos.

=== Fedora Remix 20 ===
This 13 December 2013 remix adds applications to the Fedora20 Distributions (32-bit and 64-bit versions). Included are a moderate collection of applications for flash music, application development and more.

=== Fedora Remix 27 ===
The latest version of the Remix is 27, with a beta corresponding to Fedora 28 beta. Shortly expect to see Remix 28 about the time that Fedora 28 is released.

Like regular Fedora, it offers the Gnome and KDE Plasma desktop environments. It includes software that is useful for the desktop, programming, gaming, server use, and more.

=== Fedora Remix 28 ===
This version was available 2 days after the regular Fedora 28 release.

=== Fedora Remix 29 ===
This version was available 2 days following the regular Fedora 29 release. This version included everything that was provided by Fedora 29. Proprietary media codecs needed to watch videos or listen to podcasts were included.

== See also ==
- Red Hat
