= Libranet =

Libranet Linux
- Developer: Libra Computer Systems Ltd
- OS family: Linux (Unix-like)
- Working state: Discontinued
- Final release: 3.0 / April 25, 2005
- Kernel type: 2.6.11
- Default user interface: IceWM

Libranet was an operating system based on Debian.

The last version (as of April 25, 2005) released is Libranet 3.0, which cost about $90 in US dollars for new users, or $65 for existing Libranet users. The previous version, Libranet 2.8.1, became free to download.

Libranet was formally discontinued in June 2006.

== History ==
The name comes from "Libra Computer Systems" (a company owned by the founder) and the fact that "libra.com" was taken.

The first release of Libranet was in 1999. Most Linux distributions of this time were very difficult to install, and were considered either for programmers or those who wanted a low-cost server. Libranet attempted to put out and sell a distribution that was easy to install, and meant for desktop use. Corel likewise attempted this with Corel Linux, but abandoned this and refocused on software for Windows and Mac OS X operating systems. Libranet, however, continued, and developed some recognition for having a Linux distribution that was good for desktop users. Corel sold the rights to their Linux operating system to Xandros, which later released their own offering of a Linux desktop.

From 1999 to 2003, most Linux distributions with comparable desktop usability to Libranet were also priced similarly. This began to change, however, in 2004. Linux as a whole had advanced, and many distributions were now reasonably easy to install, with a relatively user-friendly desktop. Some distributions such as MEPIS were competitive and far less expensive. Others such as Knoppix were offered at no cost.

Libranet attempted to carve a niche as the user-friendly Linux distro, with extensive support (termed "up and running support"), which, of all the desktop distros, was the most compatible with the Debian release of the time (Woody). The support offered was truly extensive: Jon Danzig, the founder, would often personally answer people's inquiries. This helped make people who had chosen Libranet be even more loyal to it.

However, with the release of Debian Sarge in 2005, along with the emergence of Ubuntu (a Debian-based distro offered at no cost, with the option to purchase support), Libranet received less attention. Debian itself revamped their installer making it easier to use (before this, a good reason to use a Debian-based distribution was that Debian's own installer was not user-friendly).

Libranet released version 3.0, which received good reviews, but the market had changed for desktop distributions. Various other commercial vendors had released free versions of their distributions, such as SUSE, which released OpenSUSE, and Red Hat, which released Fedora. Whereas Libranet sold their distribution, and then gave free extensive support, many distributors chose to give away their distribution and sell support, and/or sell proprietary software enhancements.

Jon Danzig, the founder of Libranet, died on June 1, 2005. His son and partner, Tal Danzig, had taken over the leadership of the development team, but then stated that he would stop maintaining Libranet. Daniel de Kok, the other remaining employee, went on to become a developer for CentOS.

== Cancellation of OpenLibranet 3.1 ==
There were many users who were interested in seeing Libranet, and the Libranet Adminmenu software, continue to be available. Adminmenu was an operating system setup and configuration tool. It was unique in that it also contained a user-friendly kernel compiling tool. So a team including Daniel de Kok proposed to opensource Libranet and release OpenLibranet 3.1. But after failing to obtain definitive permission for this plan from the surviving owner, and the plan was dropped.
