= 4MLinux =

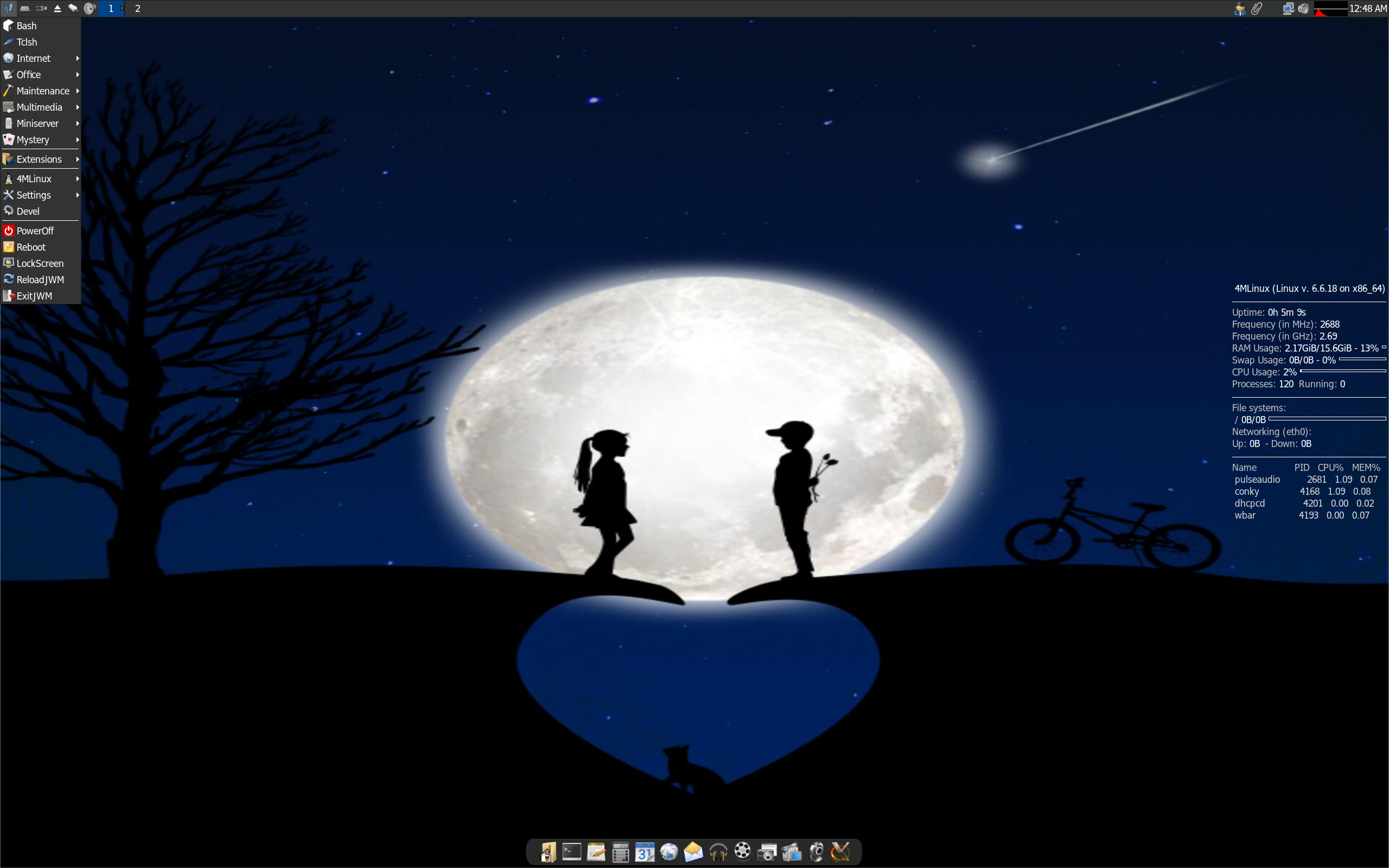
- OS family: Linux (Unix-like)
- Working state: Current
- Initial release: 2010; 16 years ago
- Latest release: 52.2 / October 31, 2026; 0 days ago
- Package manager: None
- Supported platforms: 64-bit
- Kernel type: Monolithic (Linux)
- Official website: 4mlinux.com

4MLinux is a lightweight Linux distribution. It is named "4MLinux" since it has 4 main components of the OS. Maintenance (it can be used a rescue Live CD), Multimedia (There is inbuilt support for almost every multimedia format), Miniserver (It comes with a 64-bit server is included running LAMP suite), and Mystery (Includes a collection of classic Linux games). The distribution is developed in Poland, and was first released in 2010. The distribution does not include a package manager, and uses JWM (Joe's Window Manager) as its default window manager. It also comes with Conky preinstalled. When installing programs with the distribution, the distribution will retrieve the Windows version rather than the Linux version due to it coming pre-installed with Wine (A compatibility layer for Windows applications), and not having any package manager. The distribution is geared towards people who prefer a lightweight distribution. There is a version of the distribution called the "4MLinux Game Edition" which provides 90s games natively such as Doom, and Hexen.

The distribution comes in two different versions, 4MServer, and 4MLinux. 4MLinux requires 128 MB of RAM when installed to an HDD, and 1024 MB of RAM when being used as a live CD/USB. Whereas, 4MServer requires 256 MB of RAM when installed to an HDD, and 2048 MB of RAM when being used as a live CD/USB.

4MLinux dropped 32 bit support with release 31.0.
