= DoudouLinux =

Discontinued Linux distribution for children

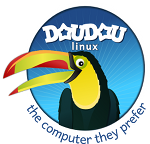
- DoudouLinux Logo

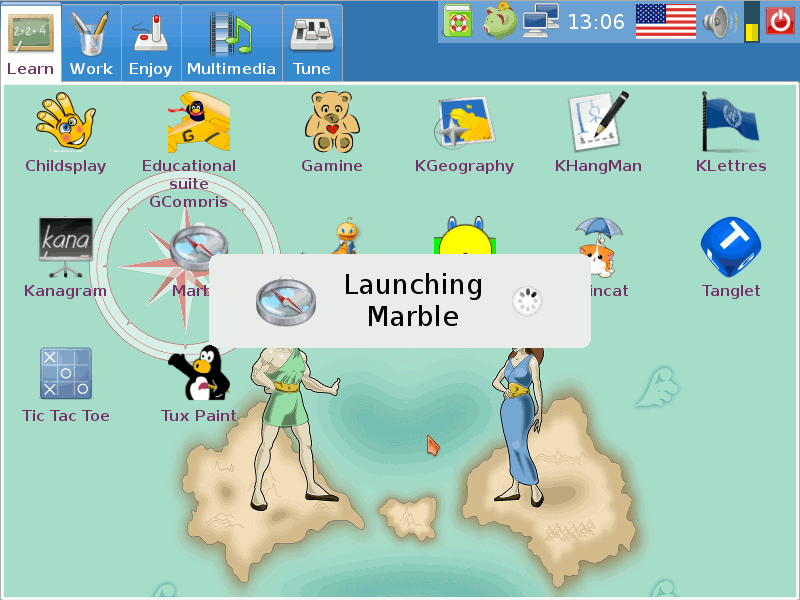
- Screenshot of the main screen with the program "Marble" being launched
- OS family: Unix-like
- Working state: Discontinued
- Source model: Open source
- Initial release: May 2010; 16 years ago
- Latest release: 2.1 / December 2013; 12 years ago
- Marketing target: Children
- Available in: 44 languages
- List of languages Arabic, Armenian, Bengali, Burmese, Chinese (China and Taiwan), Croatian, Czech, Danish, Dutch, English, Esperanto, Finnish, French, Galician, German, Greek, Hebrew, Hindi, Hungarian, Indonesian, Italian, Latvian, Lithuanian, Luxembourgish, Malay, Marathi, Norwegian (Bokmål and Nynorsk), Persian, Polish, Portuguese (Brazil and Portugal), Punjabi, Romanian, Russian, Scottish Gaelic, Serbian, Spanish, Swedish, Tajik, Telugu, Turkish and Ukrainian.
- Influenced by: Debian
- Default user interface: LXDE
- License: GPLv3
- Official website: doudoulinux.org

DoudouLinux is a discontinued Linux distribution based on Debian intended for children as young as 2 years old. DoudouLinux is named after the French word doudou which refers to a wubby, which is a comfort object such as a small blanket or a teddy bear.

DoudouLinux has not received an update since 2013, and its website has not received an update since a 2015 blog post.

== Features ==
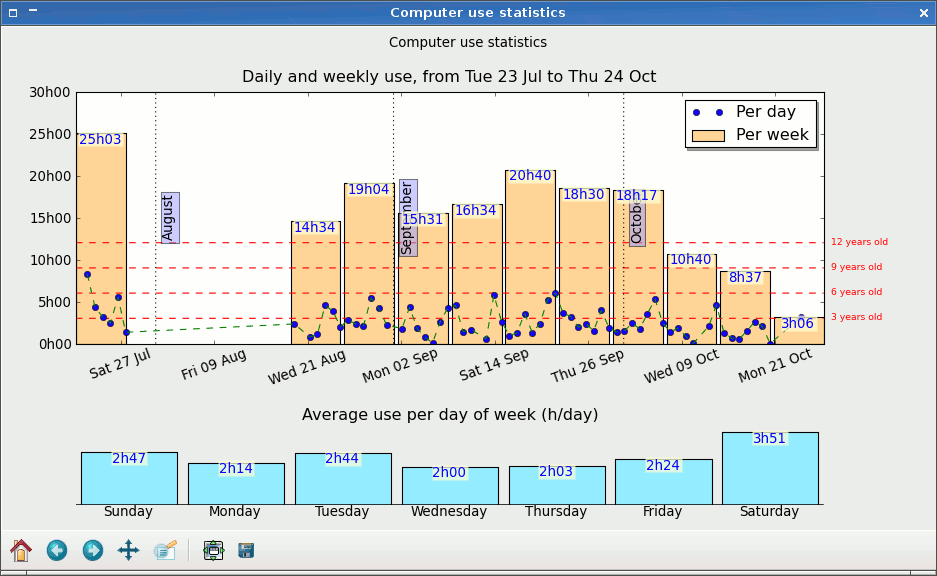
DoudouLinux's interface for monitoring computer usage

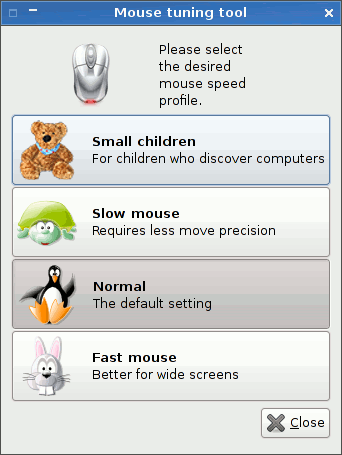

Versions 1.x are referred to as Gondwana, and versions 2.x are referred to as Hyperborea.

DoudouLinux uses a heavily modified version of the LXDE as its desktop environment, which is intended to be as simple for children to use as possible.

DoudouLinux comes with software including the GCompris suite, which includes educational software and games. It also includes another package of children's games called Child's Play, as well as several educational KDE Applications.

DoudouLinux's web browser Ephiphany comes installed with a web filtering tool called DansGuardian and uses DuckDuckGo by default

Version 2.1 has software used to monitor computer use.

== Minimum configuration ==
According to DoudouLinux's documentation, the minimum recommended configuration has three requirements: 256 MB memory, an 800 MHz processor, and an 800×600 dots display.

== Reception ==
Reviews by PCMag WebUpd8.org focused on the simplicity of the software interface and its ease of use for children.

Reviews by ILoveFreeSoftware.com and MakeTechEasier.com focused on the educational games provided by DoudouLinux.

A review by Unixmen.com focused on the updates of the 2.0 release which included a UI overhaul and security updates,

A Spanish review by Mundiario.com focused on the installation process of DoudouLinux, while an Italian review by Altreconomia.it reviewed the distro's focus on children as well as the background of an Italian company that makes use of DoudouLinux on computers.
