= Uncom OS =

Linux distribution based on Ubuntu and Arch Linux

Uncom OS is an open-source Linux distribution based on Ubuntu, Debian, and Arch Linux. The developer of the system is the Russian company Advilabs-Rus LLC. Included in the Russian Software Registry, it has its own repositories on the territory of the Russian Federation. It is a paid Linux distribution that provides unlimited technical support to its users.

The system is focused on using the capabilities of a modern Linux distribution without having to study the features of Linux systems.

The system is used by many organizations as a replacement for imported operating systems, in particular, Uncom OS is used at Moscow State University and the St. Petersburg Technopark.

== Features ==
Some of the distinctive features of the system:

- An application store based on its own Uncom OS repository. The catalog contains more than 60 thousand applications and contains many Russian programs, including those adapted directly for Uncom OS, for example, Yandex Browser and P7-Office. The store also has a section for updating Flatpak applications. The store was based on the source code of the Linux Mint app store.
- Using Flatpak as a free package management system (as opposed to proprietary Snap in Ubuntu)
- Optimization for gaming, in particular, optimization of Steam and VK Play, Proton is supported inside Steam. The developer is also testing the correctness of popular games such as Minecraft, World of Tanks and Overwatch on Uncom OS. visual images of our own design
- A Windows-style dock panel that is an optional alternative to the GNOME dock panel
- Its own menu for selecting keyboard layouts, which distinguishes the user experience of using Uncom OS from using Ubuntu, where the Alt+Shift key combination, popular among Windows users, cannot be selected through the graphical interface.
- pPeview files in the file manager, accessible by pressing the space bar
- The option to hide applications from the application menu with the ability to return them to the menu through the system settings
- The ability to change application icons through the standard graphical interface
- Extended support for VPN protocols such as SSTP and L2TP
- Own application for restoring system integrity
- Using Bottles to run Windows applications, instead of Wine in Ubuntu

In addition to technical features, all users are also provided with unlimited technical support through various channels, including through the Telegram messenger.

== Distribution ==
The distribution is freely distributed for review during the trial period. After the trial period expires, the distribution blocks the operation of some of the functionality, for example, the app store. The system is activated with a unique digital license key.

Types of licenses:

- Home — personal use
- Business — commercial use
- Enterprise — commercial use with priority technical support
- Education — non-commercial use for educational purposes

OS licenses are perpetual and can be applied on another device after deactivation on the previous one. The distribution package, along with the digital license key, is also distributed through large retail chains.

== Update history ==
Chronology of major changes:

- On May 14, 2024, a tab for updating Flatpak applications was added to the app store.
- On May 8, 2024, a Windows-style dock panel was added
- On April 25, 2024, a system recovery application was added.
- February 14, 2024 switching to the GNOME 45th version interface
- On September 4, 2023, the keyboard shortcut settings application was added to change the layout.
- September 20, 2023 added the ability to hide and change application icons
- The first release of the system was released on December 6, 2022

== Monetization ==
Uncom OS uses a new approach to monetization for the Linux community, distributing the distribution on a paid basis, even for personal use. This leads to discussions on the ethics of monetization of Linux distributions. At the same time, the commercial distribution of distributions does not violate the GPL license and the principles of free software, and many common distributions, such as Red Hat Enterprise Linux and Astra Linux, also adhere to a policy of paid support for versions of their operating systems and utilities, but unlike Uncom OS, they do not distribute their products to private users and share the open source code of their operating systems and utilities for review.
