= ArchLabs =

Linux distribution computer operating system

ArchLabs Linux
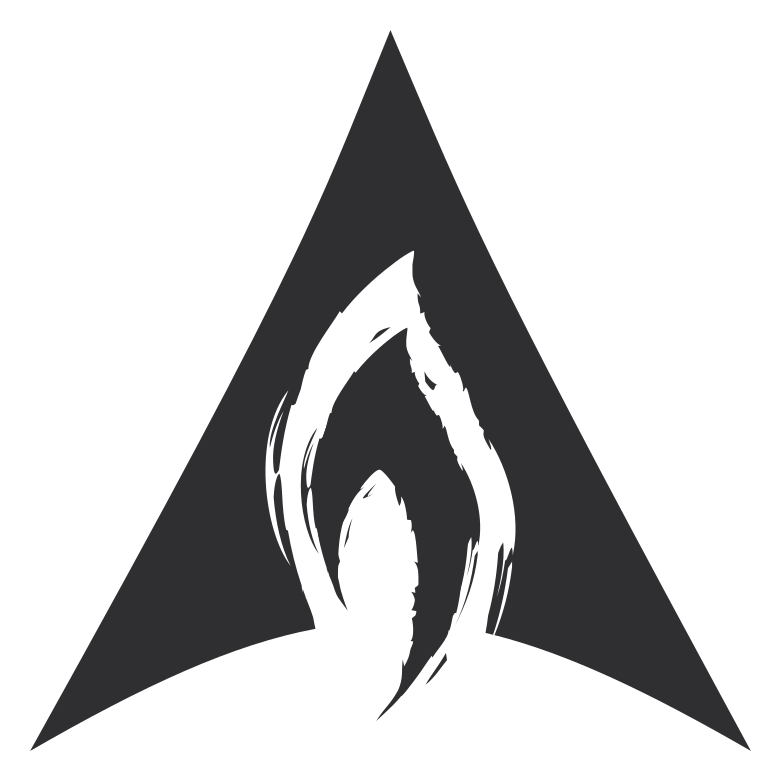

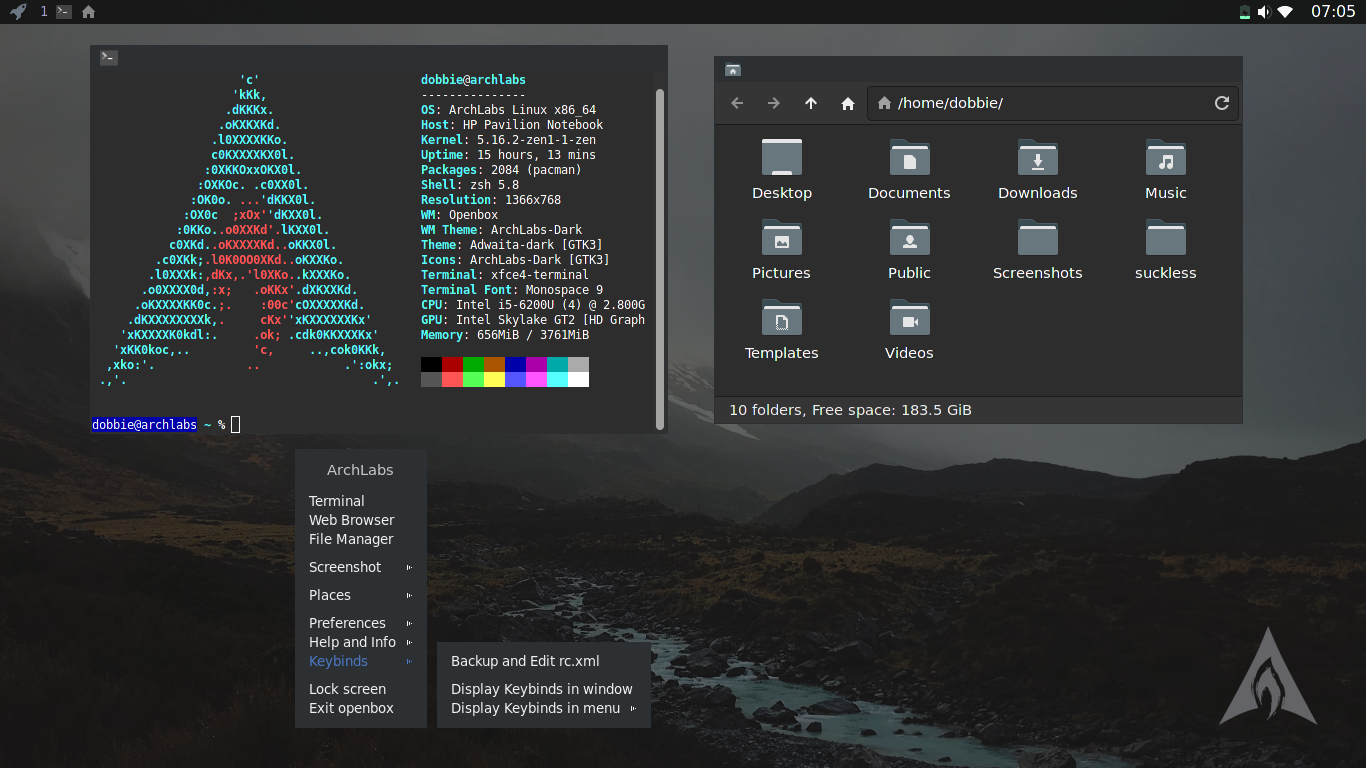
- ArchLabs 2022.01.18 with Openbox
- Developer: Nathaniel Maia & Matthew Dobson
- OS family: Linux (Unix-like)
- Working state: Discontinued
- Source model: Open source
- Latest release: Rolling release 2023.06.07 / 8 June 2023; 3 years ago
- Marketing target: General purpose
- Available in: English
- Update method: Pacman
- Package manager: Pacman
- Supported platforms: x86-64
- Kernel type: Monolithic (Linux)
- Userland: GNU
- Influenced by: BunsenLabs
- Default user interface: NA
- License: GNU General Public License

ArchLabs Linux was a lightweight rolling release Linux distribution based on a minimal Arch Linux operating system with the Openbox window manager. ArchLabs was inspired by BunsenLabs. It was last released in 2023 and is now discontinued.

== Features ==
The ArchLabs distribution contained a text-based installer, "AL-Installer" as its installation method, as well as baph, an AUR helper. The installer gave the user the ability to choose from 16 different assorted Desktop Environments and Window Managers as well as a selection of extra software, Linux Kernels, Display Managers and shells.

== History ==
Initial releases used the Calamares installer. Early versions of ArchLabs started to become bloated with many unnecessary applications and programs. This sparked a change in direction. A slim down of the ISO size from over 2GB in size down to approximately 580MB made download times a lot quicker.

Mínimo was the first of this minimal release with a change from the traditional Openbox panel, Tint2 to Polybar. Also introduced in this release was the original welcome script, named "AL-Hello" which was a nod to the "brother" distribution BunsenLabs. Mínimo was also the final release to have a release name, following releases followed a numbering pattern of YYYY.MM.

2018.02 release brought a new and improved AL-Hello welcome script and many additions and refining to the ArchLabs experience.

2018.07 saw more improvements to the newly written AL-Installer.

With the release of 2018.12 came the removal of the live environment and the post install script "AL-Hello". Options for choosing desktops and window managers as well as a selection of apps have been added to AL-Installer (ALI). Also introduced in this 2018.12 release was the in house AUR (Arch User Repository) Helper, baph (Basic AUR Package Helper).

2019.10.29 was ArchLabs third release for 2019 (After 2019.1.20 & 2019.10.28). Many changes were made including additional desktop environments and window managers added to the installer. Most notably, awesomewm and jwm.

ArchLabs first release of 2022 brought with it a new custom Window Manager called dk. Also included is a custom panel and menu for the Sway Window Manager called nwg-shell.

The ArchLabs installer now includes 16 assorted Desktop Environments and Window Managers, such as i3, dwm, bspwm, LXQt, jwm, XFCE, Awesome, Fluxbox, KDE Plasma, Deepin, Gnome, and Cinnamon. Most are installed as the developer intended with no customisation. Openbox, awesomewm, dk and Sway are the only customised environments supplied by the ArchLabs installer.

Matthew Dobson announced that 2023.06.07 would be the final release.

== Release history ==
The final release of ArchLabs Linux is "2023.06.07", which was released on 8 June 2023.

Color	Legend
Red	Old version
Green	Latest version
Blue	Future version

Version	Codename	Release date	Kernel
idea	Start	1 January 2017	—N/a
Alpha	—N/a	24 February 2017	—N/a
1.0	—	3 March 2017	—N/a
3.0	—	6 March 2017	—N/a
3.4	—	7 April 2017	—N/a
4.0	—	29 April 2017	—N/a
4.1	Yoda	4 June 2017	—N/a
5.0	R2-D2	7 July 2017	4.11.9
2017.09	Mínimo	17 September 2017	4.12.13
2017.10	2017.10	24 October 2017	4.13.19
2017.10	LTS	24 October 2017	4.9.56
2017.12	2017.12	23 December 2017	4.13.3
2018.02	2018.02	26 February 2018	4.15.5
2018.03	2018.03	4 March 2018	4.15.6
2018.05	2018.05	11 May 2018	4.16.8
2018.07	2018.07	29 July 2018	4.17.10
2018.12	2018.12	18 December 2018	4.19.9
2019.01	2019.01	20 January 2019	4.20.3
2019.10.28	2019.10.28	28 October 2019	5.3.7
2019.10.29	2019.10.29	29 October 2019	5.3.7
2020.05.04	2020.05.04	4 May 2020	5.6.8
2020.11.04	2020.11.04	4 November 2020	5.9.3
2021.05.02	2021.05.02	2 May 2021	5.11.16
2022.01.18	2022.01.18	19 January 2022	5.16.1
2022.02.12	2022.02.12	13 February 2022	5.16.8
2023.01.20	2023.01.20	20 January 2023	6.1.7
2023.02.05	2023.02.05	5 February 2023	6.1.9
2023.06.07	2023.06.07	8 June 2023	6.3.6
