= Winux =

Linux distribution based on Ubuntu

- Developer: Rafael Rachid
- OS family: Unix-like (Linux)
- Initial release: 2007
- Latest release: 11.26.10 LTS "Noble"
- Kernel type: Monolithic kernel
- License: Proprietary
- Official website: winux.is

Winux (Note: Previous and alternative names include Wubuntu, LinuxFX, Windowsfx, Windows Linux, Windows Ubuntu, Windows Theme Over Linux and Windows Linux With Copilot.) is a Linux distribution for personal computers themed close to Microsoft Windows.

== Versions ==
Linuxfx was first released in 2007. It has since been rebranded to Wubuntu, and later to Winux. However, The Register described Wubuntu as "very similar to a different distro called LinuxFX", while ZDNET quoted the distributions' developer that:

Linuxfx has its own theme [...] and its own selection of applications. [...] Wubuntu is just a Windows theme applied over Ubuntu. [...] Wubuntu has a completely different purpose than Linuxfx. Wubuntu wants to look like Windows and Linuxfx doesn't necessarily. [...] Wubuntu is just Ubuntu with opensource Windows themes applied and comes with the Powertools tool pre-installed.

Some versions are also known as Windowsfx.

LinuxFx Build 2004, Linuxfx 10.1, 10.3 and 10.5 are based on Ubuntu and use Cinnamon desktop environment. They imitate the appearance of Windows 10.

Linuxfx 10.6 is based on Linux Mint.

Linuxfx 11 is based on Ubuntu and KDE Plasma. It can emulate both the appearance of Windows 11 and Windows 10. In 2021, Adrenaline reported that its license key cost $20. As of 2025, a free and paid version are offered.

Both Wubuntu and Winux are based on Ubuntu and use KDE Plasma, and are themed like Windows 11.

== Bundled software ==
LinuxFx Build 2004 bundles a third-party Windows 10 theme called b00merang, a Control Panel-like program, a virtual assistant known as Helloa, Evolution as it the mail client, the LibreOffice office suite, and an application store. The latter four used the icons of Cortana, Microsoft Outlook, Microsoft Office and Microsoft Store. It also includes Skype, Telegram, Microsoft Teams, TeamViewer and Zoom.

Linuxfx 10.5 includes Wine, OnlyOffice, GIMP, Inkscape, Firefox, Google Chrome, Evolution, Transmission, TeamViewer, AnyDesk, Zoom, Skype, Microsoft Teams, VLC, Kodi, Visual Studio Code, and Steam. It supports Windows Installer packages and Active Directory.

Linuxfx 10.6 packages Wine, AnyDesk, OnlyOffice, OBS Studio, Telegram, Visual Studio Code, TeamViewer, Steam and Zoom. Its weather applet supports third-party weather services. It includes support for Windows Installer packages and Active Directory, and Microsoft fonts. Its installer displays advertisements.

Wubuntu 11.24.04.2 LTS includes a third-party Windows 11 theme, Wine, Microsoft Edge, Google Chrome (but not Firefox), OnlyOffice, an unofficial third-party OneDrive client, an Android virtual machine, Steam, Flatpak, and KDE Discover. A "system-admin program" called PowerTools can be purchased for $35. However, the KDE Plasma System Settings program is pre-installed.

Winux bundles "Redsand" theming, Microsoft Edge, Google Chrome, Thunderbird, OnlyOffice, Steam, Heroic Game Launcher, MissionCenter (a task manager), Hardinfo (which "provide[s] details on connected hardware"), a graphical OneDrive client, and a device-driver manager. Winux distributes several KDE applications, such as KDE Discover, Konsole, Dolphin. It supports Snap and Flatpak packages. The installation process uses the Calamares installer. Some features are implemented in PowerTools (a paid component), including "Windows-style Control Panel and Settings" and an "Android Subsystem". Winux 11.25.12 includes WinBoat, a software that can execute Windows programs inside a Docker container that runs a "full Windows environment". Winux 11.25.10 packages Wine.

== Reception ==
Richard Devine of Windows Central praised Winux's imitation of Windows, and recommended it for users transitioning away from the latter, labelling Winux as "probably the least scary Linux distro I've ever seen from the perspective of coming from Windows".

Jason Evangelho, a Forbes contributor, opined that LinuxFx looked "shockingly similar" to Windows 10, but experienced multiple software crashes "within just a few hours".

Les Pounder of Tom's Hardware recommended Winux for older hardware. He called the installation process "extremely simple", and complimented its theming and hardware support. He described issues with the Android subsystem and support for Windows programs. He also criticized a pop-up advertising the paid version for conflating purchases with donations.

TechRadar rated LinuxFX 7 out of 10.

Liam Proven of The Register critiziced the multitude of Wubuntu's alternative names, and expressed concerns about possible trademark infringement. He commented that Wubuntu's imitation of Windows "does look good", but described it as "skin-deep", recommending other Linux distributions instead.

Rich Edmonds of XDA Developers found fault with "potential copyright infringement", the database-hacking incident and the Winux's subsequent response, as well as with Winux (as a "smaller distro[...]") not being "community-developed".

Jack Wallen of ZDNet originally wrote a positive review, which he later retracted. The new review alleged that LinuxFX is "a distribution well-known to be a scam", mentioning the database breach, and that "Wubuntu is rumored to be a rebranding of LinuxFX".

== See also ==
- Linspire
- Zorin OS
