= Authbind =

Open-source system utility

authbind
- Original author: Ian Jackson
- Initial release: August 29, 1998; 27 years ago
- Stable release: 2.1.2 / January 22, 2017; 9 years ago
- Written in: C
- Operating system: Unix-like
- Platform: Cross-platform
- Type: System utility
- License: GNU General Public License
- Website: upstream git Debian archive (official location for upstream tarballs)
- Repository: git.chiark.greenend.org.uk/~ian/authbind.git

authbind is an open-source system utility written by Ian Jackson and is distributed under the GNU General Public License. The authbind software allows a program that would normally require superuser privileges to access privileged network services to run as a non-privileged user. authbind allows the system administrator to permit specific users and groups access to bind to TCP and UDP ports below 1024. Ports 0 - 1023 are normally privileged and reserved for programs that are run as the root user. Allowing regular users limited access to privileged ports helps prevent possible privilege escalation and system compromise if the software happens to contain software bugs or is found to be vulnerable to unknown exploits.

authbind achieves this by defining the LD_PRELOAD environment variable which loads a libauthbind library. This library overrides the bind() call with a version that executes a setuid helper program (/usr/lib/authbind/helper) with the socket as file descriptor 0. The helper validates its arguments and checks its configuration, calls the real bind() system call on file descriptor 0 (which also affects the original process's socket), and exits, allowing the original process to continue with the socket bound to the requested address and port.

authbind is currently distributed with the Debian and Ubuntu Linux distributions.

== Alternatives ==
- The Linux kernel's implementation of POSIX capabilities includes the CAP_NET_BIND_SERVICE which allows either explicitly enabled binaries (with "setcap CAP_NET_BIND_SERVICE+ep /path/to/binary") or binaries configured to accept the capability from the invoking user's capability set ("setcap CAP_NET_BIND_SERVICE+ei /path/to/binary") if available, making userland software unnecessary for binding to lower numeral ports. Linux capabilities, however were not introduced until the latter half of 1999, more than a year after authbind's release, and (similar to setuid/setgid) cannot be set on scripts. Both these explain why the software was initially developed.

== See also ==
- chroot
- Operating system-level virtualization
- FreeBSD jail
- Sysjail
- Solaris Containers
- LOMAC
