= Vrms =

Linux program that checks DFSG compliance on Debian-based systems prior to distribution

vrms
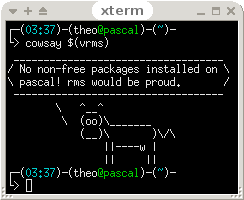
- Use of vrms interfaced with cowsay under xterm / XFCE4.
- Original author(s): Bdale Garbee; Bill Geddes
- Developer(s): Bdale Garbee; Rogério Brito
- Stable release: 1.31 / August 16, 2022; 2 years ago
- Repository: salsa.debian.org/debian/check-dfsg-status
- Written in: Perl
- Operating system: Linux
- License: GNU General Public License
- Website: https://debian.pages.debian.net/check-dfsg-status/

vrms (virtual Richard M. Stallman), later renamed to check-dfsg-status, is a program that analyzes the set of currently installed packages on a Debian-based system, and reports all of the packages from the non-free tree which are currently installed. Software gets placed in the non-free tree when it is agreed not to be too problematic for Debian to distribute but does not meet the Debian Free Software Guidelines and therefore cannot be included in their official distribution.

For each program from "non-free" installed, vrms displays an explanation of why it is non-free if one is available. This explanation is usually from a list included in the vrms package itself, but other packages can provide additional lists of explanations too.

== History ==
vrms was written by Bdale Garbee and Bill Geddes for the Debian GNU/Linux system, in response to an open discussion with Richard Stallman about the issues surrounding the availability/desirability of the "non-free" package tree in Debian. Yet the package is somewhat controversial because, while it contains Stallman's initials, it still follows Debian's definitions of free rather than that of the GNU project. The Free Software Foundation lists vrms among packages that do not respect its Free System Distribution Guidelines.

In 2005, Rogério Brito, motivated to improve the status of the package, looked at and fixed some long-outstanding bugs reported in Debian's Bug Tracking System, and, shortly afterward, the project moved to a more distributed and cooperative development with a mailing list being created and with the source code being put in a Subversion version control system hosted by Alioth's Debian server.

In August 2022, the project was renamed to check-dfsg-status to reflect the fact that its opinions are based on the Debian Free Software Guidelines (DFSG).

== Example ==
Output of vrms in a system with Sun Java, unrar and VMware Player installed:

               Non-free packages installed on localhost

sun-java5-bin             Sun Java(TM) Runtime Environment (JRE) 5.0
sun-java5-demo            Sun Java(TM) Development Kit (JDK) 5.0 demos and examp
sun-java5-jdk             Sun Java(TM) Development Kit (JDK) 5.0
sun-java5-jre             Sun Java(TM) Runtime Environment (JRE) 5.0
unrar                     Unarchiver for .rar files (non-free version)
  Reason: Modifications problematic
vmware-player             Free virtual machine player from VMware
vmware-player-kernel-modu vmware-player modules for Linux (kernel 2.6.17)

  7 non-free packages, 0.6% of 1218 installed packages.

Output in a system after deleting the non-free packages shown in vrms:

No non-free or contrib packages installed on ''hostname''! You have completed the first step to enlightenment.
