= Bdale Garbee =

Computer scientist from the United States

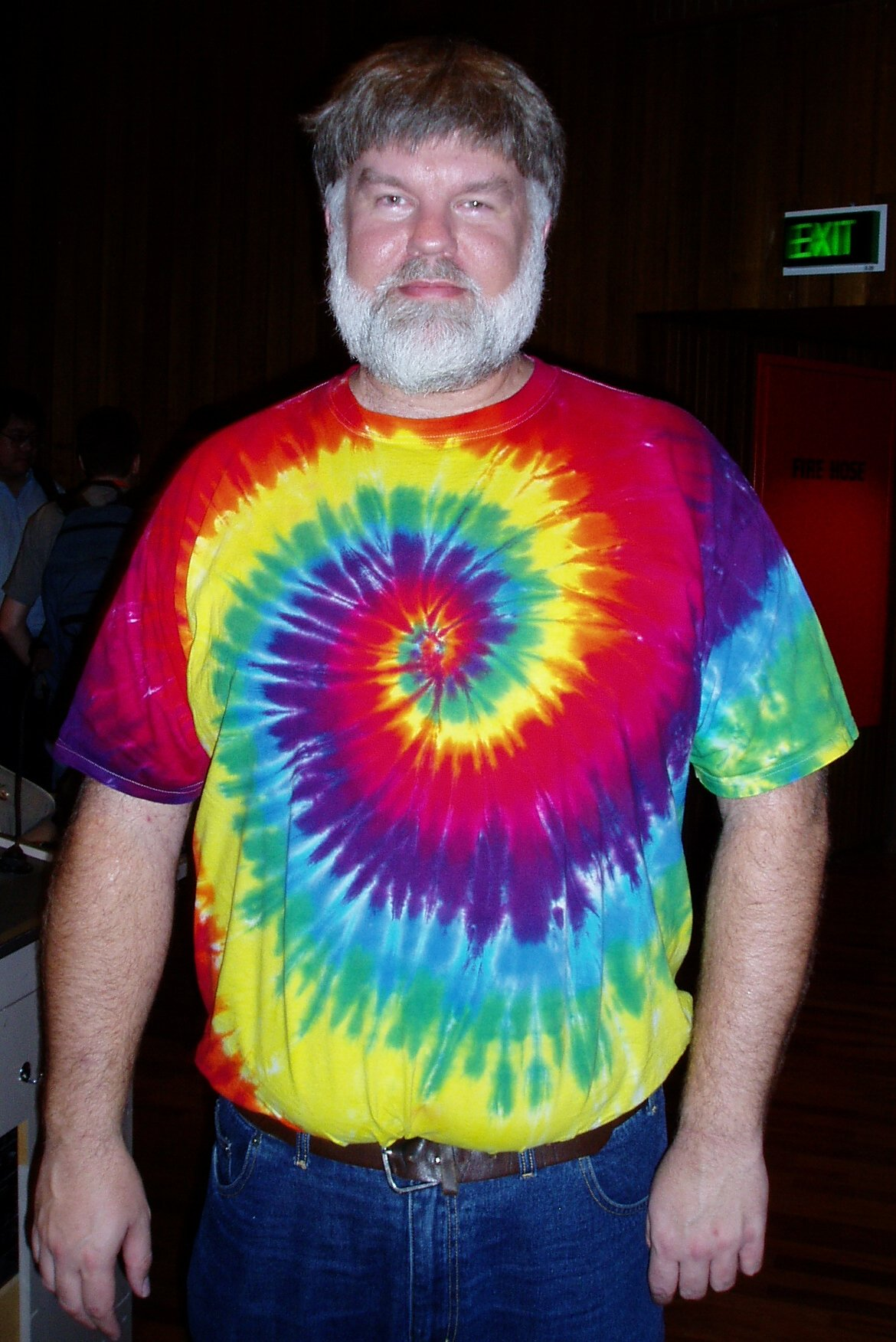
- Bdale Garbee in 2007
- Born: Alfred Dickinson Barksdale Garbee II
- Other names: Bdale Garbee
- Spouse: Karen Garbee
- Children: 2
- Website: gag.com/bdale/

Bdale Garbee (/ˈbiːdeɪl ˈɡɑːrbiː/) is an American computer specialist who works with Linux, particularly Debian. He is also an amateur radio hobbyist (KB0G), and a member of AMSAT, Tucson Amateur Packet Radio (former vice-president), and the American Radio Relay League. As of 2023 he is the President of Amateur Radio Digital Communications.

== Free software ==
Garbee has been a Debian developer since October 1994, the earliest days of the project. He set up the original developer machine (named master.debian.org) in 1995. He served as a Debian Project Leader (DPL) for one year (2002–2003), and served as chairman of the Debian Technical Committee.

Garbee has served on the board of directors of Software in the Public Interest, the non-profit organization that collects donations for Debian and many other Free software projects, since July 29, 2004, and was elected president on August 1, 2006.

Garbee was formerly on the board of directors of the Linux Foundation where he represented the interests of individual members and developers.

In September 2008, he received a "Lutèce d'Or" during the French event Paris Capitale du Libre as the FLOSS personality of the year.

In March 2011, Bdale Garbee agreed to join the FreedomBox Foundation's board of directors and chair its technical advisory committee.

He retired at the end of August 2012 from long service as the Open Source & Linux Chief Technologist at Hewlett-Packard. From September to December 2013 he was a part-time Senior Adviser to the Open Source Group at Samsung.

He was hired back by HP as Fellow in the Office of the CTO in 2014, with the goal to help driving HP's open source strategy. He retired for the second time in September 2016.

== Personal ==
An interview with Garbee and Keith Packard at linux.conf.au 2014.

The name "Bdale" is an abbreviation of "Barksdale", given in honor of his maternal grandfather, Judge Alfred D. Barksdale.

At linux.conf.au 2009, Garbee's 27-year-old beard was removed by Linus Torvalds to raise funds for Tasmanian Devil facial tumour disease research. They raised between AU$35,000 and AU$40,000.

His house in Colorado was destroyed by the Black Forest Fire in June 2013.

| Preceded by Ben Collins | Debian Project Leader; April 2002 – April 2003 | Succeeded by Martin Michlmayr |
