= Ian Jackson =

Ian Jackson may refer to:

- Ian Jackson (computer programmer), British computer programmer
- Ian Jackson (basketball) (born 2005), American basketball player
