= IRILL =

French research center

The Innovation and research initiative for free software (French: Initiative pour la Recherche et l'Innovation sur le Logiciel Libre, IRILL) is a French research center. This centre was created in September 2010 by INRIA with Pierre and Marie Curie University and Paris Diderot University and is located on the Jussieu Campus in Paris. Roberto Di Cosmo was the initial director of IRILL, Emmanuel Chailloux is the current director.

IRILL aims to provide resources to FLOSS actors like researchers, developers or industrials. It will also help technology transfer toward small and medium enterprises and improves the way FLOSS developments are currently taught.

Three projects are hosted by IRILL at time of its creation:

- MANCOOSI (MANaging the COmplexity of the Open Source Infrastructure)
- Coccinelle (software) - a framework for refactoring of C source code
- Ocsigen/Eliom

The Debsources (sources.debian.org) project to index source code from all Debian packages was initially developed by IRILL.
