= Martin Michlmayr =

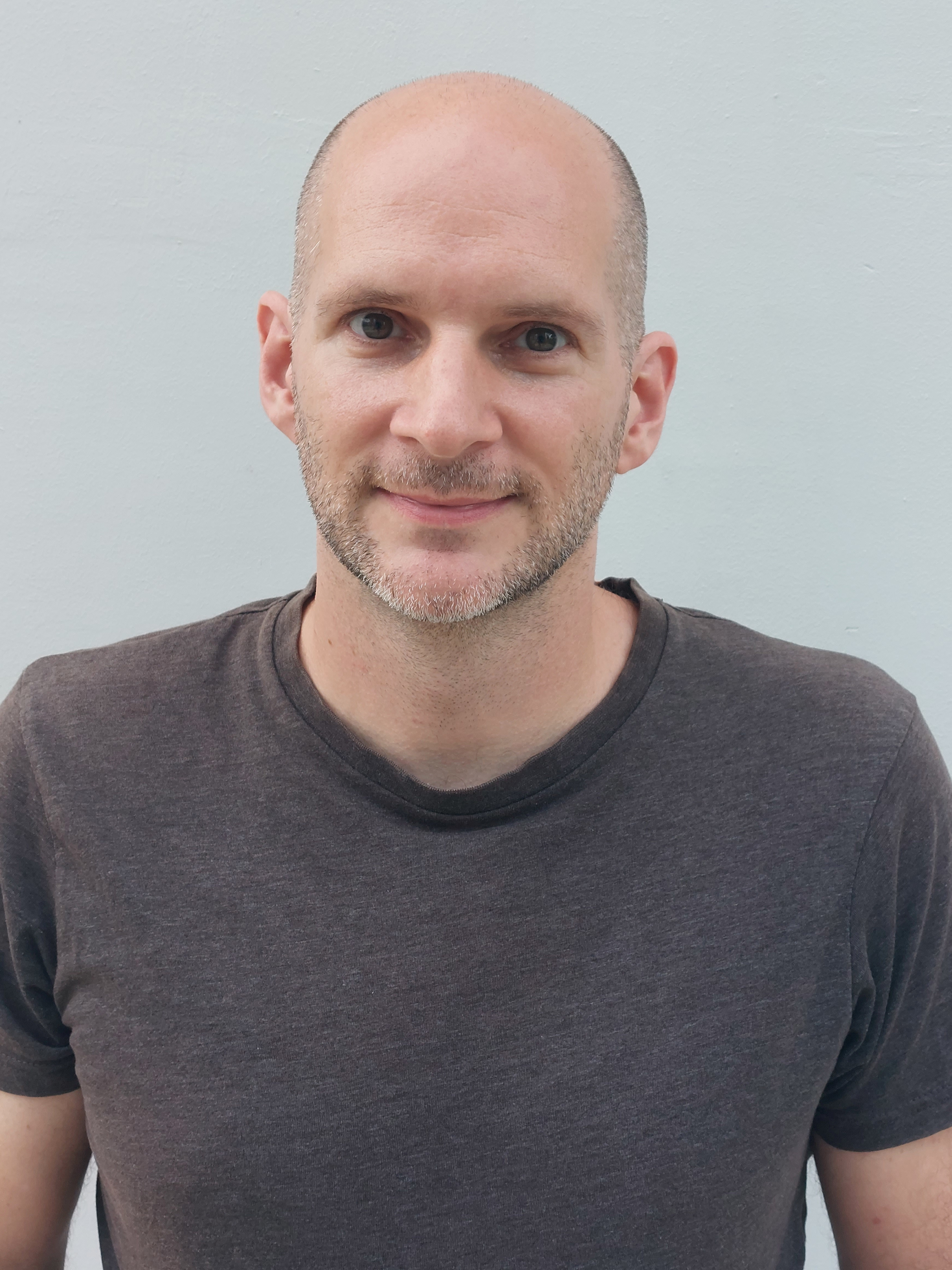
- Former Debian Project Leader
- Occupation(s): Free and open-source software advocate and Debian developer

Martin Michlmayr is a free and open-source software advocate and Debian developer, formerly president of Software in the Public Interest.

Michlmayr joined the Debian project in 2000. In 2003, Michlmayr was elected as Debian Project Leader; he was re-elected to that position one year later, in 2004.

Michlmayr contributed to Debian's New Member process, participating in the recruitment of over 120 new members. Additionally, Michlmayr made various contributions to Debian's quality assurance effort. He identified the problem of packages with inactive maintainers and implemented processes to address this problem systematically. He also became involved in identifying inactive maintainers whose packages should be reassigned; created overviews of bugs in Debian; and coordinated keysigning to improve Debian's web of trust. He also contributed to Debian's ports to the ARM and MIPS platforms, by porting Debian to several embedded devices and Network Attached Storage (NAS) devices. He used snapshots of the GCC compiler to build the entire Debian archive. This work resulted in the identification of compiler bugs as well as build errors in many open source packages.

Michlmayr completed a doctorate in technology management at the University of Cambridge in 2007. The focus of this research was on quality improvement in free software and open source projects, and particularly on release management processes and practices.

In 2013, O'Reilly awarded an open source award to Michlmayr, putting him in "the 'unsung heroes' category—the people who devote themselves to the important but not always glorious jobs that keep open source healthy".

Between 2008 and 2014 Michlmayr served on the board of directors of the Open Source Initiative, acting as the organization's secretary. He is a member of Software Freedom Conservancy's evaluation committee, which evaluates projects that apply to Conservancy for membership. Michlmayr acted as an advisor to Software in the Public Interest in the past.

| Preceded by Bdale Garbee | Debian Project Leader; March 2003 – March 2005 | Succeeded by Branden Robinson |
