= Chiark =

Chiark may refer to:

- The fictional Chiark Orbital in the Culture series by Iain M. Banks
- chiark.greenend.org.uk, run by Ian Jackson and named after Chiark Orbital
