= Stefano Zacchiroli =

Italian and French computer scientist

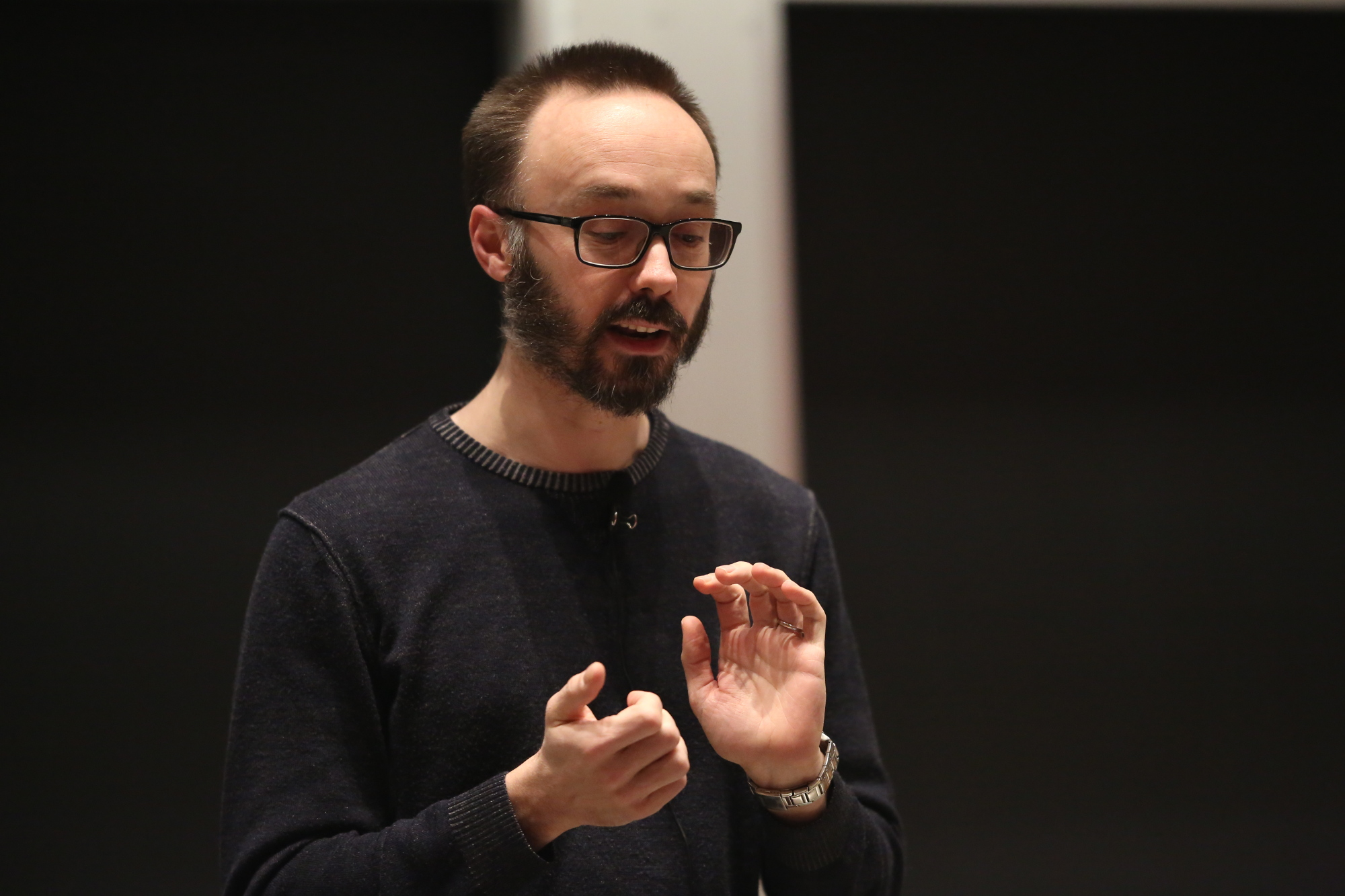
- Stefano, 4 April 2018
- Born: 16 March 1979 (age 47)
- Citizenship: Italian, French
- Education: University of Bologna
- Scientific career
- Fields: Computer science
- Workplaces: Télécom Paris
- Website: upsilon.cc/~zack/

Stefano Zacchiroli (born 16 March 1979) is an Italian and French academic and computer scientist who lives and works in Paris, and a former Debian Project Leader. He is affiliated with the Polytechnic Institute of Paris.

== Debian involvement ==
Zacchiroli became a Debian Developer in 2001. After attending LinuxTag in 2004, he became more involved in the Debian community and the project itself, eventually being elected as DPL in 2010, succeeding Steve McIntyre, a position in which he served from April 2010 to April 2013. In April 2011, he was re-elected unopposed as project leader. He was himself succeeded by Lucas Nussbaum in an election where he himself was no longer a candidate.

== Free and Open Source Career ==
In 2015, O'Reilly presented its open source award to Zacchiroli.

In 2016, Zacchiroli founded the Software Heritage project together with Roberto Di Cosmo.

He was a director of the Open Source Initiative from 2014 to 2017 and as of 2021 was a member of Free Software Foundation's High Priority Projects committee.
