= Ian Jackson (computer programmer) =

Computer programmer

Ian Jackson is a longtime free software author and Debian developer. Jackson wrote dpkg (replacing a more primitive Perl tool with the same name), SAUCE (Software Against Unsolicited Commercial Email), userv and debbugs. He used to maintain the Linux FAQ. He runs chiark.greenend.org.uk, a Linux system which is home to PuTTY among other things.

As of October 2021, he works for the Tor Project. He has previously worked for Citrix, Canonical, and nCipher.

Jackson became Debian Project Leader in January 1998, and Wichert Akkerman took his place in 1999. Debian GNU/Linux 2.0 (hamm) was released during his term. During that time he was also a vice-president and then president of Software in the Public Interest in 1998 and 1999.

Jackson received a PhD in Computer Science from Cambridge University in 1998. His PhD thesis was entitled Who goes here ? Confidentiality of location through anonymity.

Jackson was a member of the Debian Technical Committee until November 2014 when he resigned as a result of controversies around the proposed use of systemd in Debian.

== Additional works ==
- authbind (1998), an open-source system utility

Preceded by Bruce Perens	Debian Project Leader; January 1998 – December 1998	Succeeded by Wichert Akkerman
