= Roberto Di Cosmo =

Computer scientist

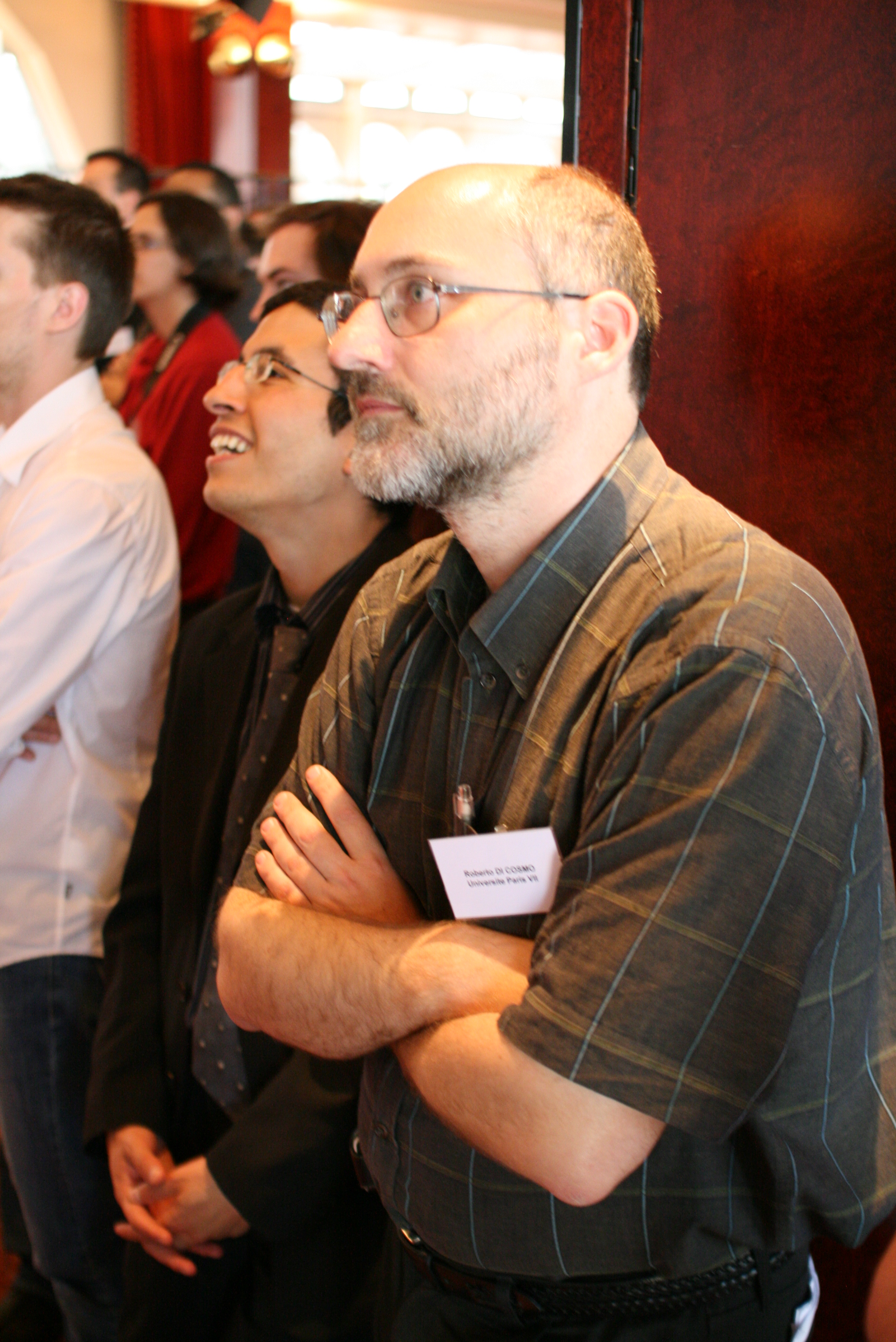
Roberto Di Cosmo

Roberto Di Cosmo is an italian computer scientist and director of IRILL, the Innovation and research initiative for free software (French: Initiative pour la Recherche et l'Innovation sur le Logiciel Libre).

== Bio ==
He graduated from the Scuola Normale Superiore di Pisa and obtained a PhD from the University of Pisa, before becoming tenured professor at the École normale supérieure in Paris, then professor at the Paris 7 University. Since 2010, he has been director of the IRILL.

Di Cosmo was an early member of the AFUL, association of the French community of Linux and Free Software users and is also known for his support of the Open Source Software movement.

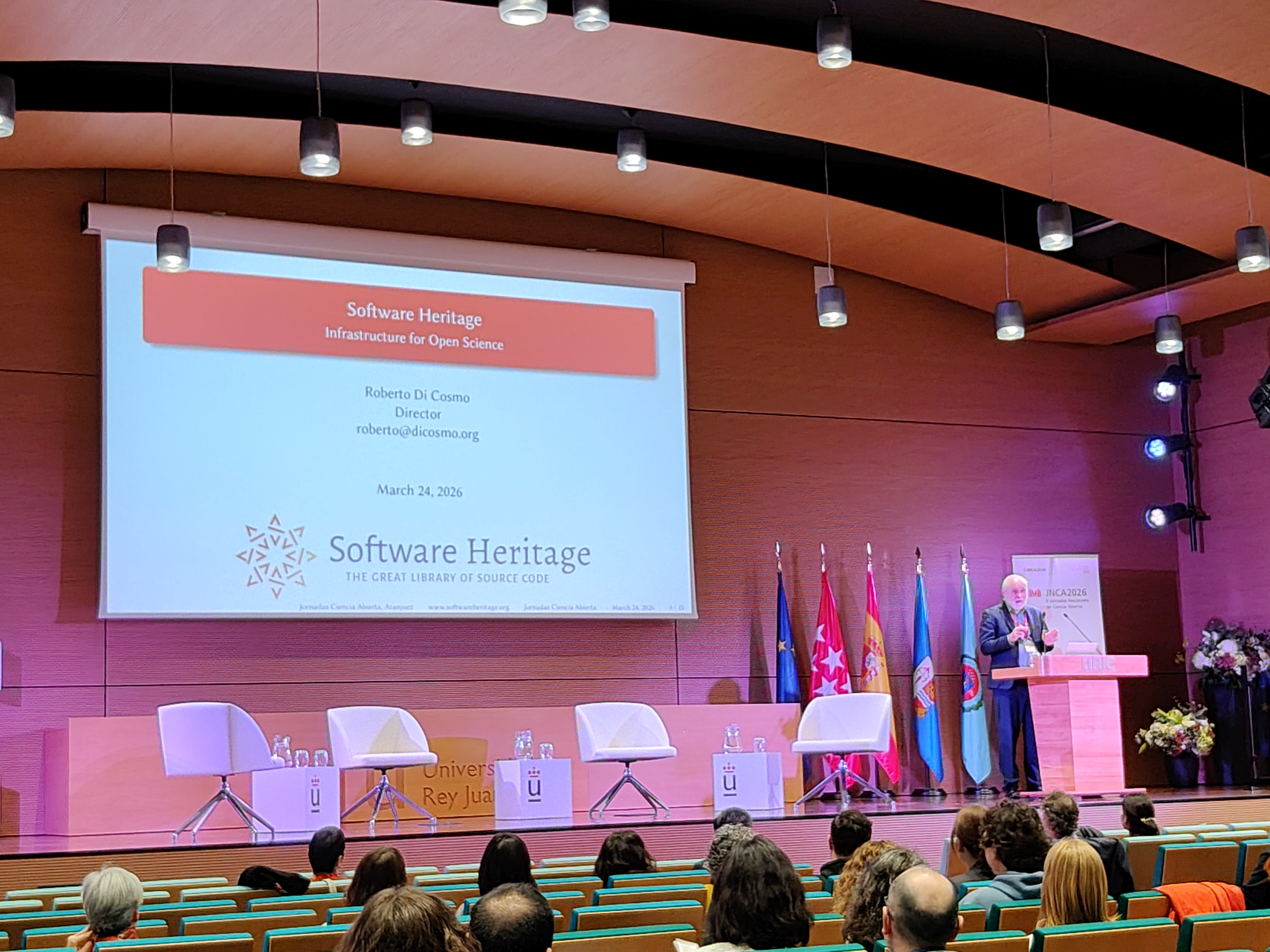
Software heritage project presentation

He became famous after releasing a paper criticizing Microsoft in 1998, entitled Piège dans le cyberespace (Hijacking the world, the dark side of Microsoft). Co-written with the journalist Dominique Nora, this book is now available under the BY-NC-ND Creative Commons licence. His most famous contribution to Linux is the first "live" Linux distribution (2000 to 2002), demolinux, which made it possible to boot Linux from a CD-ROM without setting up the entire distribution.

He was one of the founders, and the first president, of the Open Source Thematic Group within the Systematic innovation cluster.

Di Cosmo is a member of the Board of Trustees at the IMDEA Software Institute.

On June 30, 2016, Inria announced the creation of the Software Heritage initiative, which was conceived and is directed by Roberto Di Cosmo.
