= List of Debian project leaders =

This is a chronological list of Debian project leaders. Debian is a computer operating system composed of software packages released as free and open-source software primarily under the GNU General Public License, developed by a group of individuals known as the Debian project. The Project Leader is a role defined in the Debian Constitution, and is elected once per year by the Debian developers.

== Leaders ==
=== Ian Murdock ===
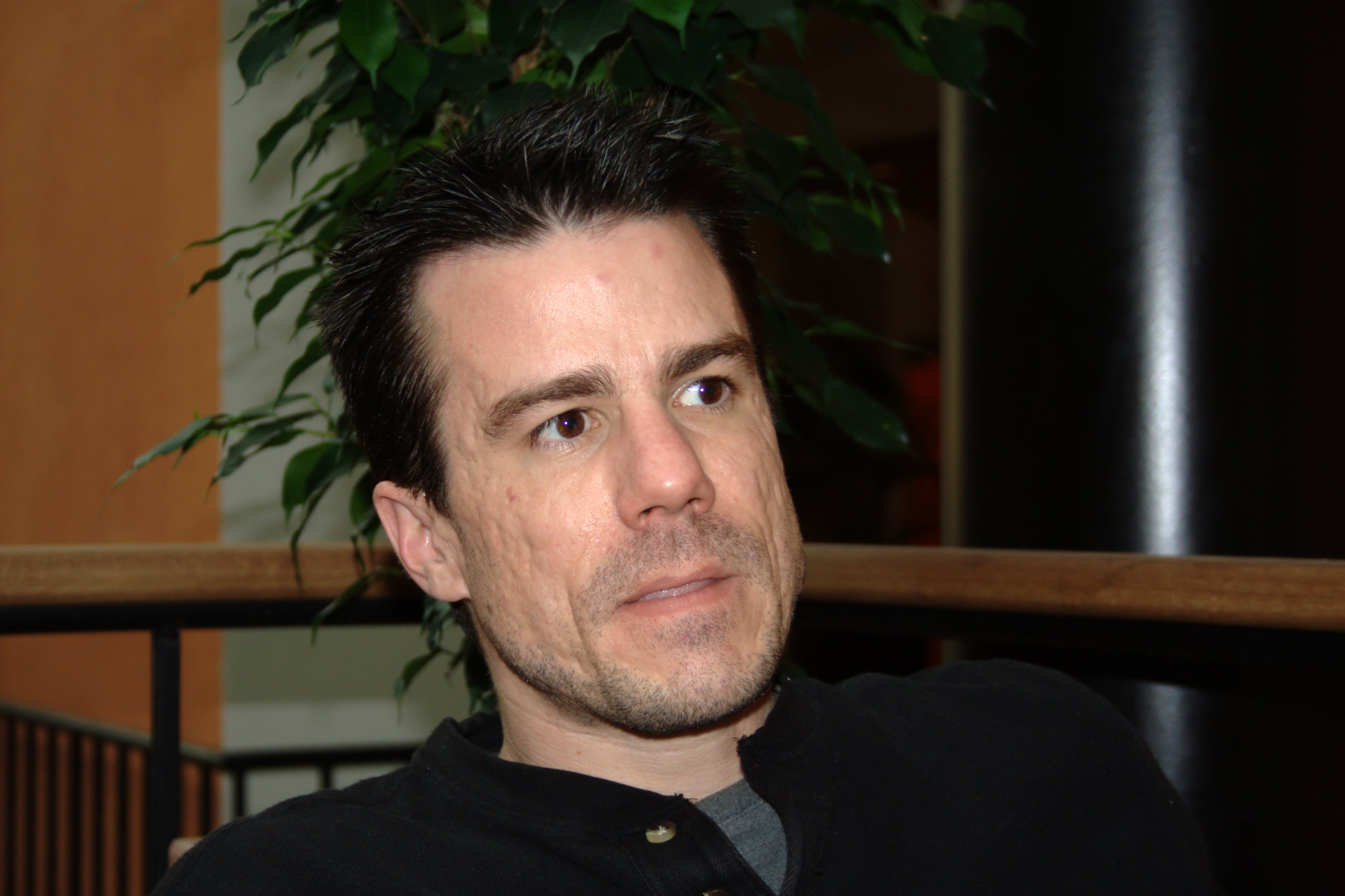
Ian Murdock

Ian Murdock, the first Debian project leader and the "ian" in "Debian", was an American software engineer. He founded the Debian project in August 1993, naming it after his then-girlfriend and later wife, Debra Lynn, and himself (Deb and Ian). He later started Progeny Linux Systems, a commercial Linux company. He was the Chief Technology Officer of the Free Standards Group and elected chair of the Linux Standard Base workgroup, CTO of the Linux Foundation when the group was formed from the merger of the Free Standards Group and Open Source Development Labs. He left the Linux Foundation to join Sun Microsystems leading the Project Indiana making OpenSolaris distribution with GNU userland. From 2011 until 2015, Murdock was Vice President of Platform and Developer Community at Salesforce Marketing Cloud. From November 2015 until his death, Murdock worked for Docker, Inc.

=== Bruce Perens ===
Bruce Perens is an American computer programmer, an advocate of the free software movement and author of BusyBox. He created The Open Source Definition and published the first formal announcement and manifesto of open source. He co-founded the Open Source Initiative (OSI) with Eric S. Raymond and Software in the Public Interest. He represented Open Source at the United Nations World Summit on the Information Society at the invitation of the United Nations Development Programme in 2005. He was the Debian project leader from April 1996 to December 1997, replacing Ian Murdock.

=== Ian Jackson ===
Ian Jackson is a long-time free software author and Debian developer. He wrote dpkg, SAUCE (Software Against Unsolicited Commercial Email), userv and debbugs. He used to maintain the Linux FAQ. He was the Debian project leader between 1998 and 1999. Debian GNU/Linux 2.0 (hamm) was released during his term. He was also a vice-president and then president of Software in the Public Interest in 1998 and 1999. He was a member of the Debian Technical Committee until November 2014 when he resigned as a result of controversies around the migration of Debian to systemd.

=== Wichert Akkerman ===
Wichert Akkerman is a Dutch computer programmer who has contributed to Debian, dpkg, Plone and strace. He was elected for two terms as the Debian project leader and served from January 1999 to March 2001. He has also served as the Secretary to Software in the Public Interest.

=== Ben Collins ===
Ben Collins is an American programmer, Linux developer and system administrator. From April 2001 to April 2002 Collins acted as the Debian project leader. During his tenure, he specialised on the UltraSPARC port and advocated for proactive security and testing policies. Collins had stood for Debian project leader two times prior to being elected. When he took up the role he commented that when he joined the project Ian Jackson, who was at the end of his term as Debian project leader, was "very inactive". Jackson was followed by Wichert Akkerman for two terms, and according to Collins "did an excellent job keeping Debian going". Once elected Collins declared his intent to get Debian moving and during his tenure he sought to provide strategic leadership to build the Debian movement.

=== Bdale Garbee ===
Bdale Garbee is an American computer specialist who works with Linux, particularly Debian. He is also an amateur radio hobbyist, a member of AMSAT, Tucson Amateur Packet Radio (former vice-president) and the American Radio Relay League and a member of the board of directors of the Linux Foundation and FreedomBox Foundation's board of directors. He was the Debian project leader for one year between 2002 and 2003.

=== Martin Michlmayr ===
Martin Michlmayr is a free and open-source software advocate and Debian developer. Michlmayr completed a doctorate in technology management at the University of Cambridge in 2007. The focus of this research was on quality improvement in free software and open source projects, and particularly on release management processes and practices. Between 2008 and 2014, he served on the board of directors of the Open Source Initiative and is a member of Software Freedom Conservancy's evaluation committee. In the past he acted as an advisor to Software in the Public Interest. He was elected as Debian project leader in 2003 and re-elected to that position in 2004.

=== Branden Robinson ===
G. Branden Robinson is known for his contributions to the packaging of the X Window System and his tenure as the Debian project leader from April 2005 to April 2006. He has contributed to Debian since 1998. His most visible contribution is his long-time maintenance of the X Window System packages, which he took over from Mark W. Eichin by uploading the 3.3.2 release of the XFree86 packages on 1998-03-25. Robinson was elected by his fellow developers in 2005 after running for the position five times between 2001 and 2005. He succeeded Martin Michlmayr, who had been elected project leader in 2003 and 2004. During Branden Robinson's term as a leader, the project achieved some incremental successes, such as a stable point release of stable by new release managers for that distribution, having AMD64 added to testing, and the inclusion of modular X in unstable.

=== Anthony Towns ===
Anthony Towns is a computer programmer who was a long-time Debian release manager, ftpmaster team member and later the Debian project leader (from 17 April 2006 until 17 April 2007). He ran for Debian project leader in 2005, but was defeated by Branden Robinson by a margin of 23 effective votes. He ran again in 2006, and was elected as the new Debian project leader on 9 April 2006, beginning his term on 19 April 2006. Towns was elected by the second-narrowest-ever margin and was the first project leader to face a recall vote while in office. Towns was also the first project leader whose support by Debian Developers was reaffirmed through a General Resolution. Since a great deal of Debian work takes place in Europe, Queensland-based Towns created the post of "Debian Second in Charge" (2IC) to lead discussion, support developers, and represent the project in locations which could more easily be reached by the runner-up candidate, Steve McIntyre, than himself.

In September 2006, the Dunc-tank project started a fund-raising programme to help Debian release its next distribution, Etch, on the scheduled date of 4 December 2006. Towns's involvement with Dunc-Tank came under severe criticism, including hitherto-unseen calls to end his Debian project leadership to make clear that the Dunc-Tank project was not officially supported by Debian project members. Some developers slowed down their unpaid work on Debian in response to the programme. Debian "Etch" was not released in December 2006 as hoped; instead its release happened in April 2007. Nonetheless, Towns views the outcome of the Dunc Tank project as positive, highlighting that Dunc-Tank opposition helped to improve quality of Debian Etch.

=== Sam Hocevar ===
Samuel "Sam" Hocevar is a French software and video game developer, author of the WTFPL version 2, a permissive free software license. Hocevar was a Wikimedia France board member from 2005 to 2006. He is known for his contributions to the VideoLAN project and his expertise in reverse engineering and image processing and for authoring the first CAPTCHA decoder framework to defeat multiple CAPTCHAs. He was the Debian project leader from 17 April 2007 to 16 April 2008.

=== Steve McIntyre ===
Steve McIntyre is a software engineer and a long-time Debian developer, known for his contributions in the field of creating Debian CD/DVD images; he is the debian-cd team leader and is responsible for generating the official images. McIntyre ran for the post of Debian project leader in 2006 and 2007 but was defeated. During the 2006 term, he acted as "Second in charge" of the Debian Project. In 2008 he was elected the Debian project leader, and was re-elected in 2009. He chose not to run in the 2010 election.

=== Stefano Zacchiroli ===
Stefano Zacchiroli is an Italian-French academic and computer scientist who lives and works in Paris. He became a Debian Developer in 2001 involved mainly in the OCaml packaging and in the quality assurance team. He was the Debian project leader between April 2010 and April 2013.

=== Lucas Nussbaum ===
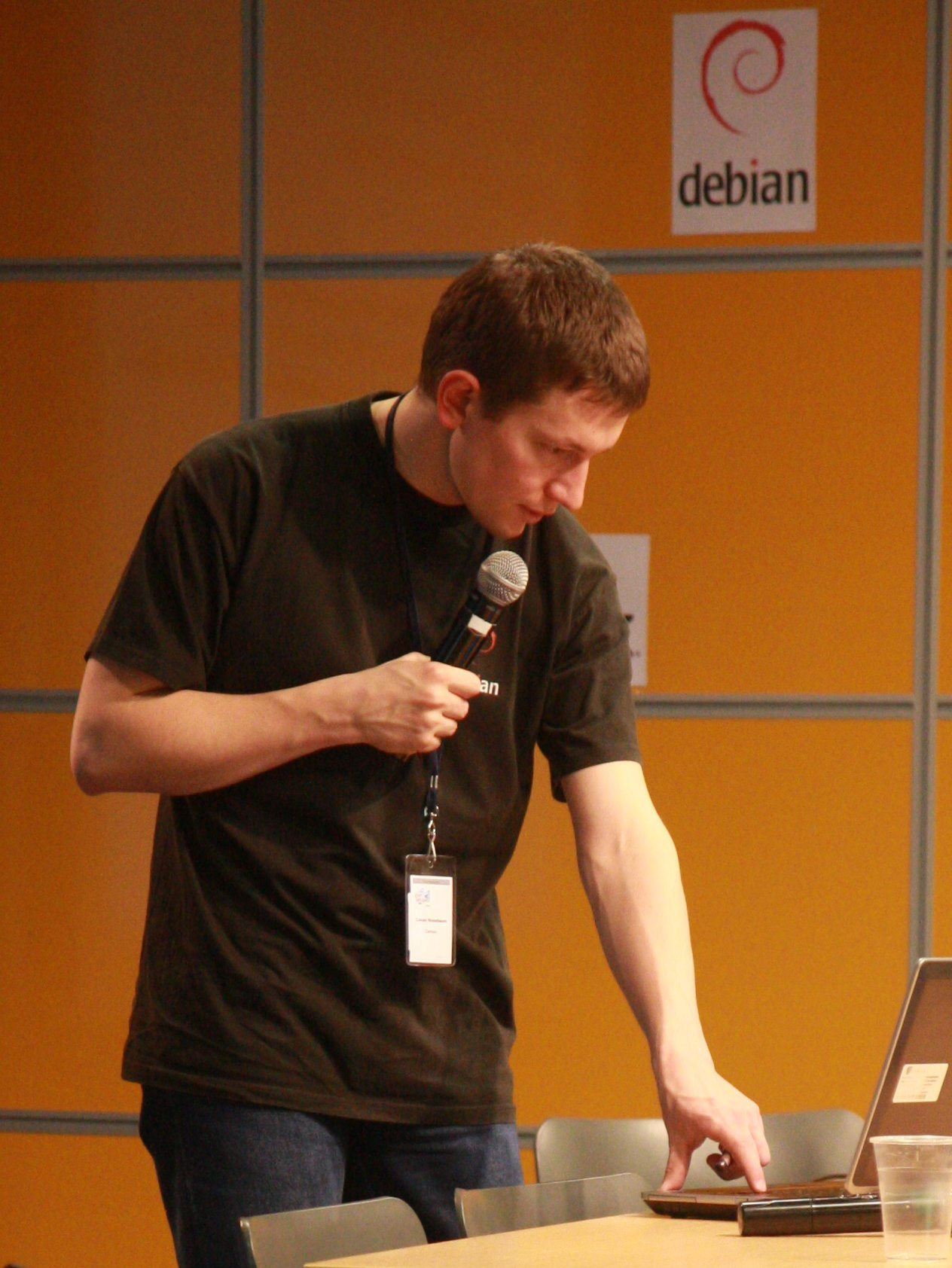
Nussbaum in 2013

Lucas Nussbaum is a French computer science engineer and assistant professor at University of Lorraine, researcher at LORIA laboratory. Nussbaum was elected leader of the Debian project in April 2013. He has been a Debian Developer since 2007. Since then, he has been active, amongst other things, as a Debian Ruby packager, with the Universal Debian Database or the full rebuilds of the Debian Archive. During the 2012 election, outgoing leader Stefano Zacchiroli announced that this would be the last term for which he would run; thus, in the 2013 election, the election did not include the incumbent. Nussbaum ran for the first time, opposite Gergely Nagy and Moray Allan. His term started on April 17, 2013. He was re-elected on April 14, 2014.

=== Neil McGovern ===
Neil McGovern was elected in April 2015, after running for the second time in a row.

=== Mehdi Dogguy ===
Mehdi Dogguy, a Tunisian-French technical manager at Électricité de France, was elected in April 2016, running without opponents.

=== Chris Lamb ===
Chris Lamb, a British freelancer, was elected in April 2017, running against the incumbent leader Mehdi Dogguy. He was re-elected in April 2018.

=== Sam Hartman ===
Sam Hartman served as DPL from April 2019 to April 2020. Hartman worked as the Chief Technologist at the MIT Kerberos Consortium and as a Security Area Director of the Internet Engineering Task Force, and joined Debian in 2000. He was elected running against Joerg Jaspert, Jonathan Carter and Martin Michlmayr and focused his term on resolving conflicts in Debian and facilitating project-wide discussions and decision-making on contentious technical issues.

=== Jonathan Carter ===
Jonathan Carter was elected in April 2020, running against Sruthi Chandran and Brian Gupta. Carter was re-elected in April 2021, running against Sruthi Chandran and in April 2022, running against Felix Lechner and Hideki Yamane. In April 2023, he was re-elected without opponents.

=== Andreas Tille ===
Andreas Tille was elected in April 2024, running against Sruthi Chandran. This was his first time running for the position after being a Debian Developer for more than 25 years. He was re-elected in April 2025, running against Gianfranco Costamagna, Julian Andres Klode, and Sruthi Chandran.

=== Sruthi Chandran ===
Sruthi Chandran was elected in April 2026, running without opponents.

== Comparison ==
Debian project leaders

Leader	First year	Total years	Age at first term
Murdock, Ian	1993	3 ^{a}	20
Perens, Bruce	1996	2 ^{b}	38
Jackson, Ian	1998	1 ^{c}	
Akkerman, Wichert	1999	2	
Collins, Ben	2001	1	29
Garbee, Bdale	2002	1	
Michlmayr, Martin	2003	2	
Robinson, Branden	2005	1	
Towns, Anthony	2006	1	27
Hocevar, Sam	2007	1	28
McIntyre, Steve	2008	2	34
Zacchiroli, Stefano	2010	3	31
Nussbaum, Lucas	2013	2	
McGovern, Neil	2015	1	
Dogguy, Mehdi	2016	1	
Lamb, Chris	2017	2	
Hartman, Sam	2019	1	
Carter, Jonathan	2020	4	38
Tille, Andreas	2024	2	56
Chandran, Sruthi	2026	current	

- ^a From August to March
- ^b From April to December
- ^c From January to March
