= Software in the Public Interest =

American nonprofit organization

Software in the Public Interest, Inc.
- Founded: June 16, 1997; 29 years ago
- Type: 501(c)(3)
- Location: New York City, United States
- Fields: Software
- Key people: Michael Schultheiss (President); Jonatas L. Nogueira (Vice President)
- Revenue: $723,853 (2020); $522,719 (2021); $485,337 (2022)
- Expenses: $341,298 (2020); $413,172 (2021); $546,645 (2022)
- Website: www.spi-inc.org

Software in the Public Interest, Inc. (SPI) is a US 501(c)(3) non-profit organization domiciled in New York State formed to help other organizations create and distribute free open-source software and open-source hardware. Anyone is eligible to apply for membership, and contributing membership is available to those who participate in the free software community.

SPI was originally created to allow the Debian Project to accept donations. It now acts as a fiscal sponsor to many free and open source projects.

SPI has hosted Wikimedia Foundation board elections and audited the tally as a neutral third party from 2007 to 2011.

== Associated projects ==
The 48 currently associated projects of SPI are:

- 0 A.D.
- Adélie Linux
- ankur.org.in
- Arch Linux
- Arch Linux 32
- ArduPilot
- The Battle for Wesnoth
- Compile Farm
- Debian
- Drizzle
- FFmpeg
- Ganeti
- Gentoo Linux
- GNUstep
- GNU TeXmacs
- haskell.org
- Himmelblau Foundation
- Libreboot
- LibreOffice
- Lua
- Manasource
- MinGW
- MPI Forum
- NTPsec
- ns-3
- OFTC
- Open Bioinformatics Foundation
- Open MPI
- Open Voting Foundation
- OpenEmbedded
- OpenSAF
- OpenSSL Foundation
- OpenZFS
- PMIx
- POCO
- PostgreSQL
- Privoxy
- Rigs of Rods
- Rocket
- SproutCore
- Swathanthra Malayalam Computing
- Synthea
- systemd
- translatewiki.net
- Tux4Kids
- The Whisper Project
- YafaRay
- Z-Anatomy

== See also ==
- List of free and open-source software organizations
