= KDE neon =

Linux distribution based on Ubuntu

- Base logo (many thematic variations also in use)

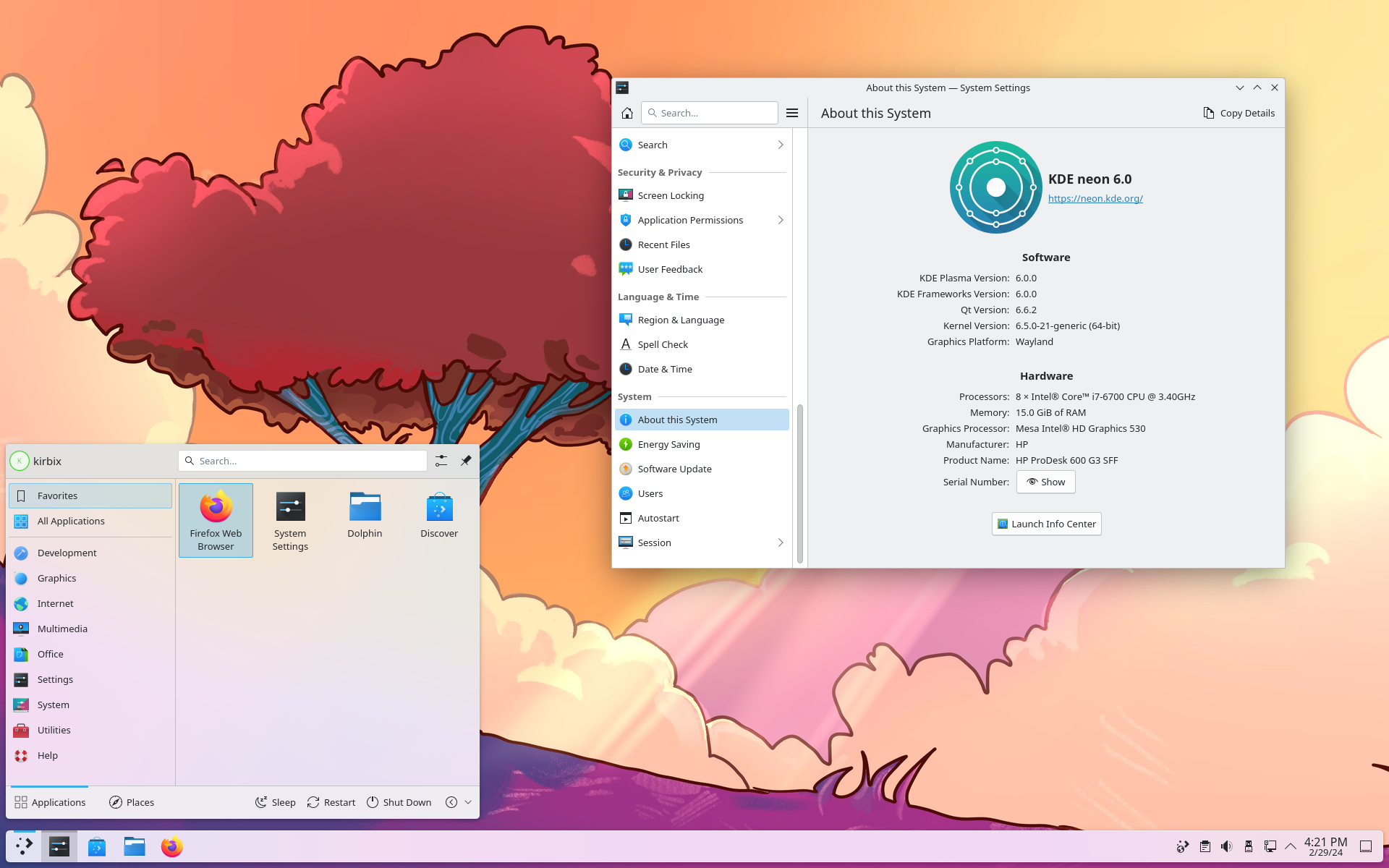
- KDE neon 6.0
- Developer: KDE
- Written in: C/C++/Qt 6
- OS family: Linux (Unix-like)
- Working state: Current
- Source model: Open source
- Initial release: June 8, 2016; 10 years ago
- Latest release: User Edition: 20250605, based on Ubuntu 24.04 and Plasma 6, kernel Linux 6.5 / 5 June 2025; 17 months ago
- Repository: community.kde.org/Neon/Git
- Marketing target: People who want the newest versions of KDE Plasma
- Available in: 80 languages
- List of languages Afrikaans, Albanian, Amharic, Aragonese, Arabic, Assamese, Asturian, Basque, Belarusian, Bengali, Bokmål, Bosnian, Breton, Bulgarian, Burmese, Catalan, Chinese, Crimean, Croatian, Czech, Danish, Dutch, Dzongkha, English, Esperanto, Estonian, Finnish, French, Friulian, Gaelic, Galician, German, Greek, Gujarati, Hebrew, Hindi, Hungarian, Icelandic, Indonesian, Interlingua, Irish, Italian, Japanese, Kannada, Kazakh, Khmer, Korean, Kurdish, Latvian, Lithuanian, Macedonian, Malay, Malayalam, Mandarin, Marathi, Nepali, Norwegian, Occitan, Oriya, Persian, Polish, Portuguese, Punjabi, Romanian, Russian, Serbian, Sinhala, Slovak, Slovenian, Spanish, Swedish, Tajik, Tamil, Telugu, Thai, Turkish, Ukrainian, Uyghur, Vietnamese, Welsh
- Update method: APT
- Package manager: PackageKit/Discover (GUI)
- Supported platforms: x86-64/AArch64
- Kernel type: Monolithic
- Userland: GNU, Ubuntu long-term support base
- Default user interface: KDE Plasma 6
- License: Various open-source licenses, mainly the LGPL-2.1 and GPL-2
- Official website: neon.kde.org

KDE neon is a Linux distribution developed by KDE based on Ubuntu long-term support (LTS) releases, bundled with a set of additional software repositories containing the latest versions of the Plasma 6 desktop environment/framework, Qt 6 toolkit and other compatible KDE software. First announced in June 2016 by Kubuntu founder Jonathan Riddell following his departure from Canonical Ltd., it has been adopted by a steadily growing number of Linux users, regularly appearing in the Top 20 on DistroWatch.com's popularity tables.

It is offered in stable and development variants. The User Edition is a stable release featuring the latest KDE packages that have passed their quality assurance, while the Testing, Unstable, and Developer Edition branches use the latest beta and unstable nightly releases of KDE packages (the last of which bundled with KDE development libraries and headers).

== Differences from Kubuntu ==
Because Kubuntu has the KDE Plasma suite on an Ubuntu base OS, KDE neon often is mistaken for Kubuntu and vice versa. However, the primary difference between the two operating systems is that Kubuntu maintains stable releases and an LTS version of Ubuntu while KDE neon focuses on updating developer editions of KDE applications without maintaining stable releases of Ubuntu unless the root user actively chooses to upgrade their systems. KDE neon forces the user to update the distro with PackageKit package instead of Advanced Packaging Tool. This approach prevents possible issues during the KDE packages update.

== Hardware ==
Seven laptops have been released with KDE neon pre-installed: KDE Slimbook (released on Thursday, 26 January 2017), KDE Slimbook II (Thursday, 8 February 2018), KDE Slimbook III (2020), KDE Slimbook IV (Wednesday, 6 July 2022) KDE Slimbook V (2024), KDE Slimbook VI (2024), and KDE Slimbook VII (2025)

== History and versions ==
KDE neon first started taking shape in late 2015 as a way to provide a rolling release of KDE software on top of Ubuntu's stable OS base. Daily installation images began being built in January 2016. These images were based on Ubuntu 15.10, but in April 2016, upgrades to Ubuntu 16.04, which would eventually become the base for the first general release, happened on 8 June 2016.

KDE neon announced in January 2017 that the distribution will be switching its installer from Ubiquity to Calamares due to Ubiquity "not having some features". In February 2018, KDE neon developers removed the LTS Editions from the downloads page, but kept these editions in the download mirrors because of "lots of people asking which edition to use and what the difference is." In May 2018, KDE started changing KDE neon from being based on Ubuntu 16.04 to Ubuntu 18.04. KDE neon preview images, based on Ubuntu 18.04, became available in August 2018. On 10 August 2020, KDE released a rebased version of KDE neon, based on Ubuntu 20.04.

As KDE neon is primarily a packaging of KDE software (and occasionally updated dependencies) on top of Ubuntu LTS, its versions are simply numbered off the Plasma release version. However, some notable versions of KDE neon User Edition are listed below to show technical progression.

In August 2025 the development of KDE Linux was announced which is meant to be the "reference implementation OS with Plasma and KDE apps". This is contrary to KDE neon for which it was clearly negated that it is "the KDE distro". Instead KDE neon was "primarily intended for technical Linux/KDE users who want immediate access to the latest KDE offerings". The future of KDE neon was not mentioned in the announcement and is uncertain at the moment.

=== Version history ===
Version	Release date	Description
5.6	8 June 2016	Based on Ubuntu 16.04 base, using Plasma 5.6. This was the first version of KDE neon considered a general release.
5.13	26 September 2018	neon 5.13 was the first version built both on Ubuntu 16.04 and on 18.04. It was released in June 2018 based only on Ubuntu 16.04, but early tests based on 18.04 were made available in August. The user edition was made upgradeable to 18.04 in September, and in early 2019 the Ubuntu 16.04 based build was discontinued.
5.15	12 February 2019	Alongside the 5.15.0 release of KDE Plasma, KDE neon upgraded to version 5.15. At this point, KDE neon started making KDE applications available in Snap format as well as the usual deb packages. This also helps make it easier to install the latest KDE applications on other Linux distributions without needing to upgrade other components such as KDE frameworks. KDE Neon still uses apt based packages by default, but the snap packages are built and maintained using the neon build system and their packaging is part of the neon project.
5.19	9 June 2020	After upgrading to KDE Plasma 5.19, neon began the work of porting to Ubuntu 20.04. After testing, the public release of KDE neon officially switched over to Ubuntu 20.04 on 10 August 2020.
5.20	13 October 2020	The KDE neon 5.20 was released alongside KDE Plasma in October 2020. Although this was a major release for KDE Plasma, KDE neon didn't have any major technical changes other than the version upgrade itself.
5.21	16 February 2021	The latest edition of KDE neon was released alongside KDE Plasma in February 2021. Improvements included a focus on Wayland support, a new application launcher and Plasma System Monitor, aiming to succeed KSysGuard.
5.22	9 June 2021	
5.23	14 October 2021	
5.24	8 February 2022	
5.25	14 June 2022	
5.26	11 October 2022	Base update to Ubuntu 22.04 LTS. Desktop Environment update to Plasma 5.26.
5.27	14 February 2023	Desktop Environment update to Plasma 5.27.
6.0	28 February 2024	Desktop Environment upgrade to KDE Plasma 6.
6.1	18 June 2024	Desktop Environment update to KDE Plasma 6.1.
6.2	8 October 2024	Base upgrade to Ubuntu 24.04 LTS. Desktop Environment update to KDE Plasma 6.2.
6.3	1 February 2025	Desktop Environment update to KDE Plasma 6.3.
6.4	17 June 2025	Desktop Environment update to KDE Plasma 6.4.
6.5	21 October 2025	Desktop Environment update to KDE Plasma 6.5.
6.6	16 February 2026	Desktop Environment update to KDE Plasma 6.6.
6.7	16 June 2026	Desktop Environment update to KDE Plasma 6.7.
Legend: Unsupported Supported Latest version Preview version Future version

Fresh installation images are built regularly, grabbing the latest packages from Ubuntu and the latest packages from the KDE neon repositories.

== See also ==
- Graphical user interface
