= Zorin OS =

Ubuntu-based Linux distribution

- Logo

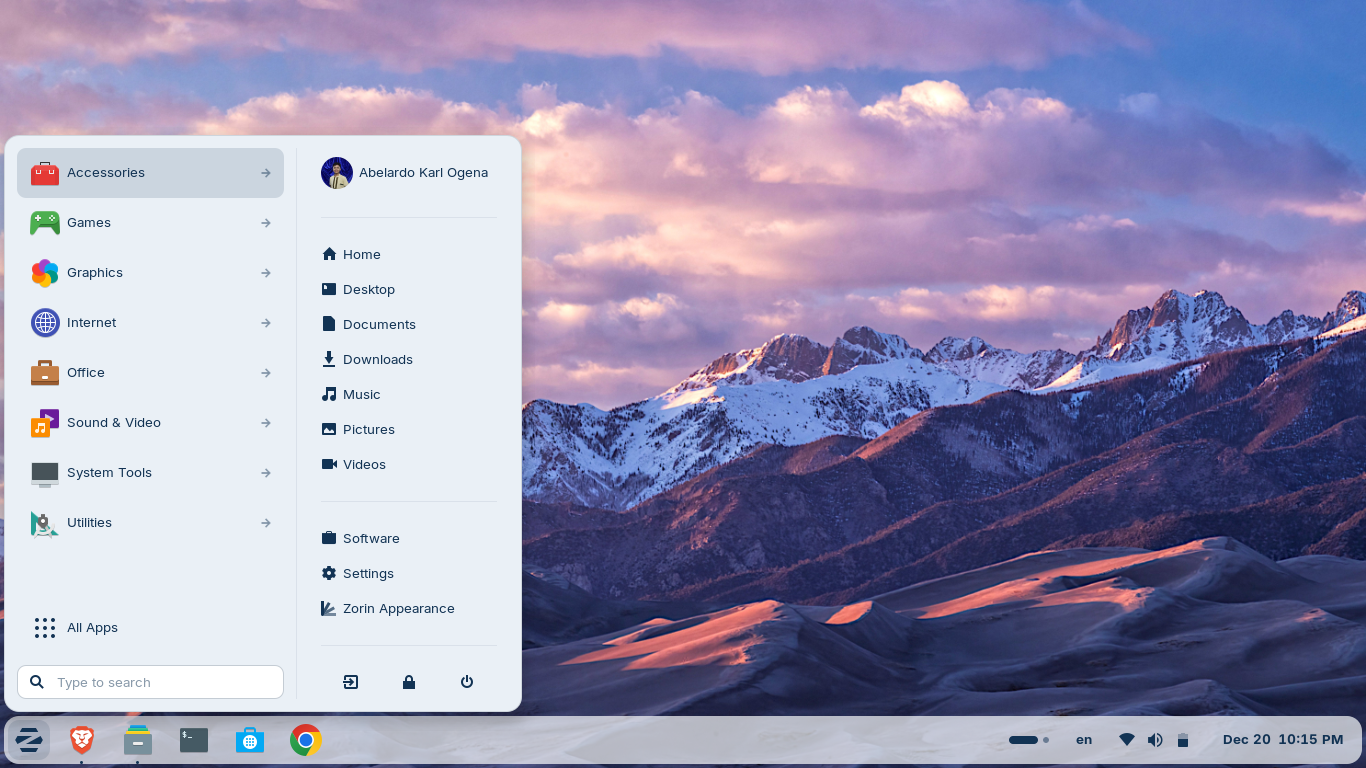
- Zorin OS 18 desktop with modified GNOME desktop environment
- Developer: Zorin Group
- Written in: C, C++, Python, D, Java
- OS family: Unix-like (Linux kernel)
- Working state: Current
- Source model: Open-source
- Initial release: 2009
- Latest release: 18.1 / 15 April 2026
- Repository: launchpad.net/~zorinos/+archive/ubuntu/stable/+packages
- Marketing target: Personal computers
- Available in: Over 50 languages
- Update method: Software Updater
- Package manager: APT, dpkg, Snap, flatpak
- Supported platforms: x86_64
- Kernel type: Monolithic (Linux kernel)
- Userland: GNU
- Default user interface: GNOME, Xfce
- License: Free software + some optional proprietary device drivers
- Official website: zorin.com/os/

Zorin OS is an operating system based on Ubuntu which provides both free and paid versions. It uses a GNOME and Xfce 4 desktop environment by default, although the desktop is heavily customized and is for users more familiar with Windows, Chrome OS and macOS. Zorin OS Pro is a premium paid version offering additional desktop appearance customization options and apps for creative users such as for photo or video editing. Zorin is marketed as a privacy focused operating system aimed at everyday computer users.

== Features ==
Zorin OS is available in various free and paid versions including versions using Xfce for use with older computers, instead of the traditional GNOME. Zorin OS follows the long-term releases of the main Ubuntu system and uses its own software repositories as well as Ubuntu's repositories. The desktop environment themes can resemble those of Windows, macOS, or Ubuntu and allow the interface to be familiar regardless of the previous system a user has used. Zorin OS Lite, the Xfce-based edition for older computers, will be supported through versions 17 and 18, with updates until June 2029, and is expected to be discontinued from version 19.

In January 2020, the developers announced plans to release Zorin Grid, which would be software for installing and maintaining Zorin OS within a network, aimed at companies and schools. As of April 2026, the software is unreleased.

== History ==
The project was started in 2008 by co-founders Artyom and Kyrill Zorin. The company is based in Dublin, Ireland.

Zorin OS was initially released on 1 July 2009. Since version 16.3, the system's upgrade tool can be used to upgrade existing installations; earlier versions required users to do a clean install. 18.1 is the most recent version.

In 2026, Zorin became one of the operating systems refusing to comply with international age verification laws.

== Reception ==
Zorin OS has been noted as having intuitive and familiar layouts, functionality, and installation process; as well as for making it easy to use a Windows-similar layout.

== Adoption ==
In April 2016, the Italian city of Vicenza began migrating approximately 900 municipal computers from Windows to Zorin OS. The transition was reported to be cost-neutral while improving system speed on older hardware and offering security benefits. The city cited long-term cost savings and the ethical value of open-source software as key drivers for the decision.

Following Microsoft's end of support for the Windows 10 operating system in October 2025, and partly due to the high Windows 11 system requirements, privacy concerns and backlash against integrated AI features, Zorin OS received 1 million downloads in five weeks as an alternative operating system. On January 12, 2026 it was announced that downloads of Zorin OS 18 reached the 2 million mark in under three months, with a majority of downloads coming from Windows users.

=== Versions ===
Legend:
Unsupported
Supported
Latest version
Preview version
Future version

Version	Release Date	Support End	Base	Kernel version	Features/Notes
Zorin OS 16	17 August 2021	31 May 2025	Ubuntu 20.04 LTS	5.11, 5.13, 5.15	Visual changes, based on Ubuntu 20.04 LTS, Flatpak support out of the box. Ease of use, stronger security and better hardware compatibility. "Zorin OS Upgrader" tool added; updated software packages; same kernel version as Ubuntu 22.04.
Zorin OS 17	20 December 2023	1 June 2027	Ubuntu 22.04 LTS	6.2, 6.5, 6.8,	Wine 9.0 and Bottles, Reading Strip, Logseq, LibreOffice 24.2, updated Linux Kernel and Graphics Stack, better hardware support. Software updates, e. g. LibreOffice 24.8. Additional window management and theming settings. Redesigned software store. For 17.3 Brave is the default web browser.
Zorin OS 18	14 October 2025	1 June 2029	Ubuntu 24.04.3 LTS	6.14.0-xx	Taskbar updates, updated apps (Evolution, Files, Calendar), new apps (Web Apps, Camera replaced Cheese), a new window tiling system, OneDrive file integration, enhanced performance, lower latency sound with PipeWire, menu changes, RDP, and better hardware compatibility.
