= AppStream =

Linux application programming interface

- Developer: Matthias Klumpp
- Stable release: 1.1.6 / 12 August 2026; 18 days ago
- Written in: C
- Type: Application programming interface
- License: GNU Lesser General Public License, GNU General Public License
- Website: www.freedesktop.org/wiki/Distributions/AppStream/
- Repository: github.com/ximion/appstream

AppStream is an agreement between major Linux vendors (i.e. Red Hat, Canonical, SUSE, Debian, Mandriva, etc.) to create an infrastructure for application installers on Linux and sharing of metadata.

The initiative was started as early as 19-21 January, 2011.

The project describes itself as: "an initiative of cross-distro collaboration, which aims at creating an unified software metadata database, and also a centralized OCS (Open Collaboration Services) user-contributed content database, thus providing the best user experience."

With the 0.6 release, the scope of the project was expanded to include more metadata for other software components, such as fonts, codecs, input-methods and generic libraries, which will allow applications to query information about software which is available in a distribution-independent way. This enhances the quality of data displayed in software-centers, but also makes it possible for 3rd-party application installers like Listaller to find the components a new application needs to run in the distribution's package database. Additionally, the new metadata allows easier installation of prerequisites needed to build software in the first place, as well as matching upstream applications with distribution packages and matching packages across distributions, which might improve the process of exchanging patches.

AppStream is also used by packaging methods such as Snap, Flatpak, and AppImage.

== See also ==
- Package manager
- PackageKit, GNOME Software and Apper
- Ubuntu Software Center
