= Endless OS Foundation =

American information technology company

Endless Mobile, Inc.
- Company type: Private
- Industry: Computer hardware; Computer software; Consumer electronics; Digital distribution; Fabless manufacturing
- Founded: 2011; 15 years ago, in San Francisco, California, U.S.
- Headquarters: San Francisco, California, U.S.
- Area served: Worldwide
- Key people: Matt Dalio (CEO); Marcelo Sampaio (CGO); Richard Vignais (CDO); Camila Soares (Ground Impact Lead); Jonathan Blandford (VP, Engineering)
- Products: Endless OS; Endless Mini; Endless One; Endless Mission
- Website: endlessglobal.com

Endless Mobile, Inc. is an American information technology company that develops the free EndlessOS distribution of Linux and the reference platform hardware for it. The company was founded in 2011 and is based in San Francisco, California, U.S. with an additional office in Rio de Janeiro, Brazil.

== History ==
Endless was founded in May 2012 in San Francisco, California by Matthew Dalio and Marcelo Sampaio. In the first three years, the company focused on designing through field research in Rocinha, the largest favela in Rio de Janeiro, Brazil, and also in Guatemala.

In April 2015, the company was launched for the general public through a campaign on the crowdfunding platform Kickstarter. It raised $176,538 with 1,041 backers in less than 30 days.

In November 2015, Endless started to sell computers at Claro stores in Guatemala. Before that, the product was being sold in own kiosks. January 2016 marked the launch of Endless Mini, a white spherical PC the size of a grapefruit, costing $79 and $99.

On April 1, 2020, Endless became a nonprofit organization, Endless OS Foundation.

== Product ==
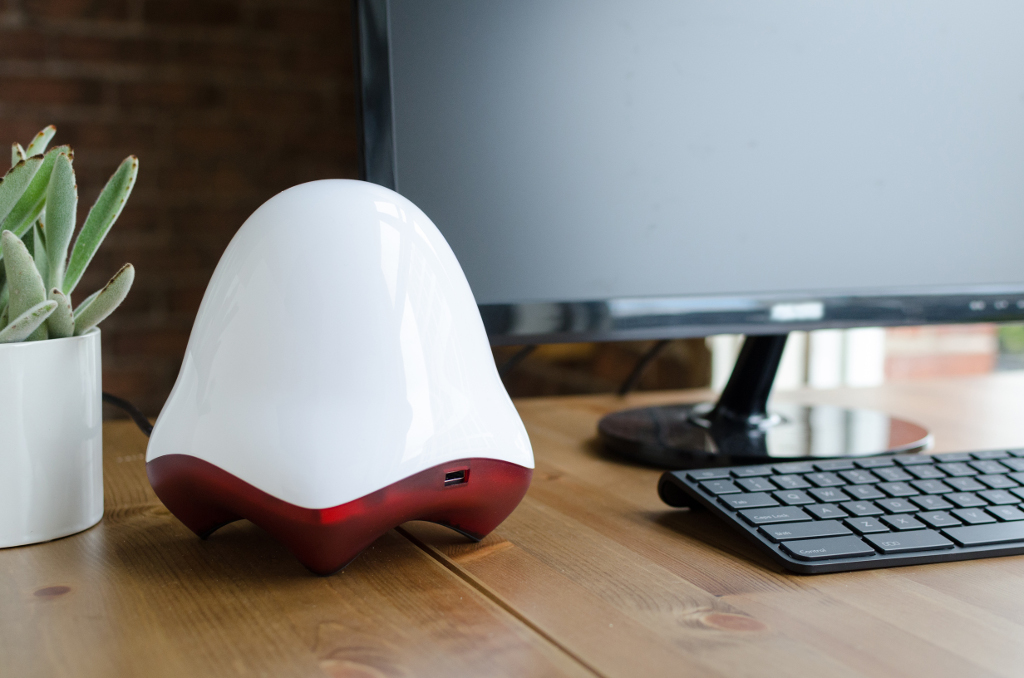
Endless computer

=== Hardware ===
According to the specifications found in their store there will be several models based either on an Intel Celeron N2807 processors (Mission and Endless) or on a quad-CPU AMLogic S805 Cortex A5 ARM processor (Mission Mini and Endless Mini).

=== Software ===
Endless OS is a Debian derivative distribution. It is built on top of the Linux kernel and other open source technologies (Chromium, GNOME, GRUB, GTK, PulseAudio, systemd, X.Org, and many more). Unlike most Linux distributions, it uses a read-only root filesystem managed by OSTree and Flatpak for application delivery and update. The user interface is based on a highly modified GNOME desktop environment. Endless Computers publish their FOSS components and forks on GitHub. They submit many of their patches upstream.

The first public release was Endless OS 2.1.0 in July 2014. Endless OS 3.3.6 was released in mid-December 2017. Endless OS 4.0.0 is via Direct Download or Torrent. Endless OS 5.0.4 Basic, was released on January 27, 2023. In May 2024 version 6.0 was released, including Linux kernel 6.5, the GNOME 43.9 desktop environment, and support for dark mode.

== Reception ==
Endless Mini was awarded CES Editors' Choice at CES 2016 in Las Vegas, Nevada, according to Reviewed.com.

Endless Mini was selected by TechSpot as one of the best devices showcased at the 2016 Mobile World Congress.

== Reviews ==
PC World said that the Endless computer can be useful for areas with limited Internet access since it comes preinstalled with a lot of useful software and content, but for users who have easy access to the Internet, there are alternatives that are significantly more powerful or significantly cheaper.
