= Ubuntu Software Center =

Ubuntu software distribution platform

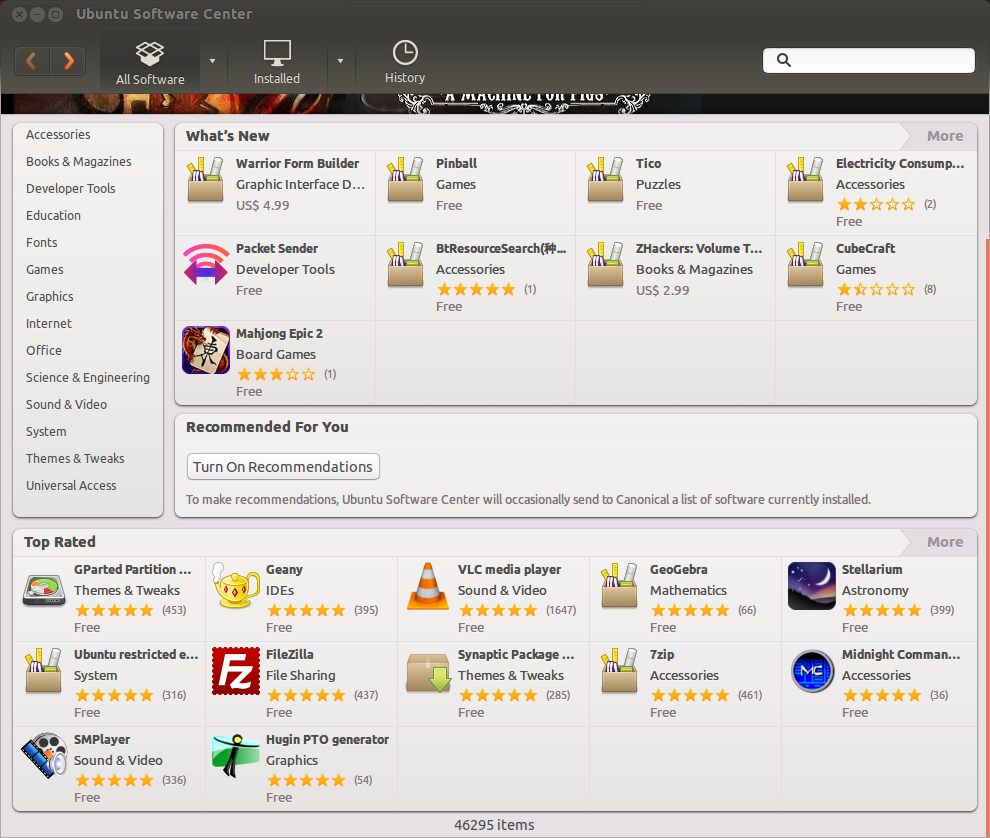
- Ubuntu Software Center 13.10 on Ubuntu 13.10. The application is called the "Ubuntu Software Centre" outside of the U.S.
- Original author: Canonical Ltd. / Ubuntu Foundation
- Developer: Canonical Ltd.
- Initial release: 29 October 2009; 16 years ago
- Final release: 16.04 / 20 April 2016; 9 years ago
- Repository: code.launchpad.net/software-center
- Written in: Python
- Platform: Ubuntu Desktop Edition 9.10 and later Ubuntu Touch 1.0 and higher
- Type: Digital distribution (Apps, Books); Package manager
- License: GPLv3, LGPLv3
- Website: apps.ubuntu.com/cat/ launchpad.net/software-center

Ubuntu Software Center, or simply Software Center, is a discontinued high-level graphical front end for the APT/dpkg package management system. It is free software written in Python, PyGTK/PyGObject based on GTK.

The program was created for adding and managing repositories, as well as Ubuntu Personal Package Archives (PPA) and on Ubuntu, the Ubuntu Software Center also allowed users to purchase commercial applications.

Development was ended in 2015 and in Ubuntu 16.04 LTS. It was replaced with GNOME Software.

== Development history ==
In early 2009 Ubuntu developers noted that package management within Ubuntu could be improved and consolidated. Recent releases of Ubuntu, such as Ubuntu 9.04 (Jaunty Jackalope) included five applications for package management which consumed space and other resources, as well as provide confusion to users. Applications could be downloaded using the basic Add/Remove Applications or with the Synaptic Package Manager. The Software Updater provided updating for installed packages and Computer Janitor cleaned up packages that were no longer needed. The Software Sources application allowed user selection of the package download location.

Ubuntu developers set as a goal:

"... there should be one obvious mechanism for installing, removing, and updating software in Ubuntu, with a self-evident name and an interface anyone can use. There should be a coordinated system for developers and enthusiasts to improve the usefulness of descriptions and other metadata for software packages. The software updates interface should be honed to maximize the voluntary installation of updates across the millions of computers on which Ubuntu is installed. And projects and vendors whose software is packaged for Ubuntu should be encouraged to provide links to their software's presence in the Software Store, instead of command-line installation instructions."

Canonical introduced the Software Center gradually, starting with Ubuntu 9.10 (Karmic Koala) with complete functionality expected by Ubuntu 11.10, in October 2011. By May 2011, the plan had mostly been completed:

October 2009 — version 1.0.2 shipped with Ubuntu 9.10 (Karmic Koala)
Introduced a new simple interface for locating, installing, and removing software, with better security based on PolicyKit instead of gksudo.
April 2010 — version 2.0.2 shipped with Ubuntu 10.04 (Lucid Lynx) LTS
The Software Center added lists of non-application packages in a simplified manner and also provide subcategories for applications and Personal Package Archives.
October 2010 — version 3.0.4 shipped with Ubuntu 10.10 (Maverick Meerkat)
Allowed users to purchase software and showed a history of past installations, removals and purchases, including undoing specific changes.
April 2011 — version 4.0 shipped with Ubuntu 11.04 (Natty Narwhal)
Added user rating and reviewing software, and the ability to see ratings and reviews of other participating Ubuntu users.
October 2011 — Ubuntu 11.10 (Oneiric Ocelot)
Software Center's fifth version was rewritten in GTK3, improving design (better integration with system theme, promoting banner added, nicer listing of apps), start-up time was improved too. Software Center was partially prepared for touch control by including larger icons. Software Center also brought Unity Launcher integration, sorting by ratings and system requirements for applications. Some GDebi technology was also integrated to improve speed when handling .deb files.
19 December 2011
An online edition of the Ubuntu Software Center was released, the Ubuntu Apps Directory. The Web store shows the same content as the Software Center application, with a download button that opens the application if running Ubuntu or a link to download the Ubuntu operating system installer if running a different operating system.
April 2012 — Ubuntu 12.04 (Precise Pangolin)
Ubuntu Software Center gained new monochrome elements. Canonical created a Web-based developer platform to help programmers to create applications for Ubuntu. Software Center included a new category: "Books and magazines", ability to show video presentations of paid applications and multiple screenshots per one app. And also added progress bar support for Software Centre.

In August 2015 Chris Hoffman of PC World criticized the application, indicating that Canonical was not maintaining it properly while work on the replacement application was being pursued. In particular, he noted that paid applications were not being supported properly and that Canonical had not informed developers of this. The application still works for installing and managing free software applications.

In November 2015 Canonical announced that development would end and the application would be replaced by GNOME Software in Ubuntu 16.04 LTS.

== See also ==
- Ubuntu One

=== APT graphical front ends ===
Other examples of a high-level graphical front end for APT:

- Apper
- AppStream
- KPackage
- Synaptic (software)
- GNOME Software
