= KDE Linux =

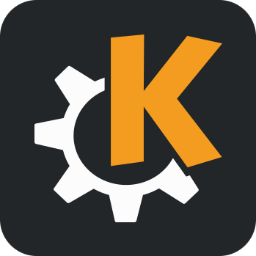
- Developer: KDE
- OS family: Linux (Unix-like)
- Working state: Current
- Repository: invent.kde.org/kde-linux/kde-linux
- Package manager: Discover software center app
- Official website: linux.kde.org

KDE Linux is a general purpose, user-focused Linux distribution by the KDE community currently in alpha status. It features an immutable architecture currently built with Arch Linux packages, eschewing the pacman package manager in favor of Flatpaks installed with the Discover software center app. Users can acquire software not available in Discover via Distrobox as AppImages, or by installing 3rd-party user-space package managers such as Nix or Homebrew.
