= KPackage =

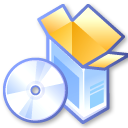

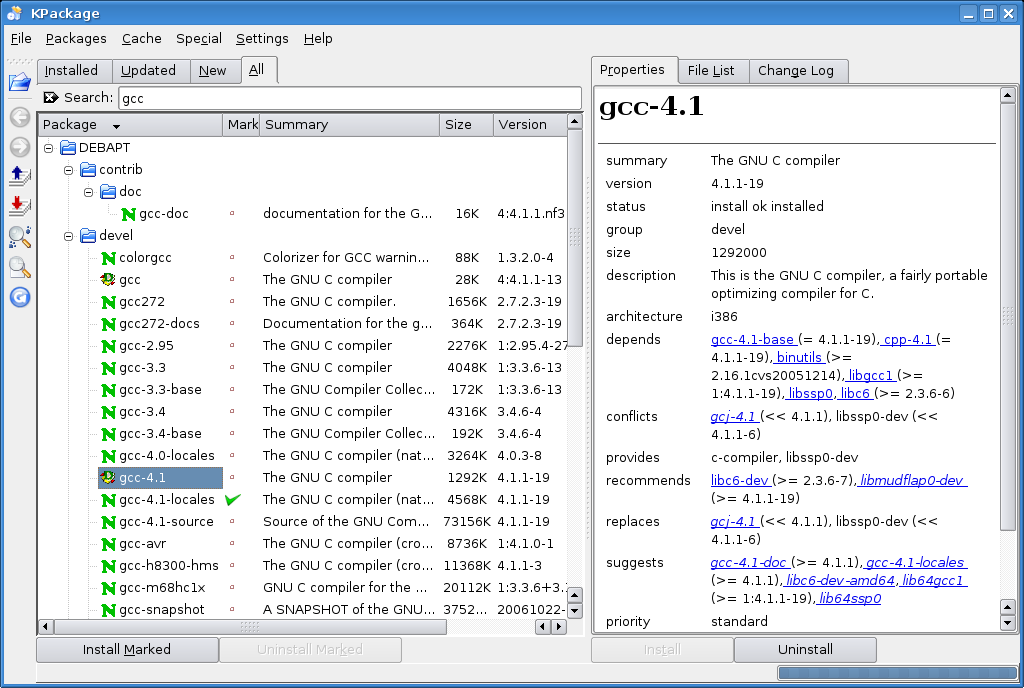
- Screenshot of KPackage
- Developer: Toivo Pedaste
- Final release: 5.87.0 / 2 October 2021; 4 years ago
- Repository: invent.kde.org/frameworks/kpackage
- Written in: C++
- Operating system: Unix-like
- Type: Package management
- License: GPL
- Website: www.general.uwa.edu.au/u/toivo/kpackage/

KPackage was KDE's package manager frontend.

It supported BSD, Debian, Gentoo, RPM and Slackware packages. It provided a GUI for the management and upgrade of existing packages and the installation and acquirement of new packages. Additionally, it provided functionality to help manage package caches. KPackage was part of kdeadmin, and was developed at KDE.org.

== See also ==
- PackageKit
- Synaptic (software)
- Ubuntu Software Center
