= Software Updater =

Ubuntu package manager

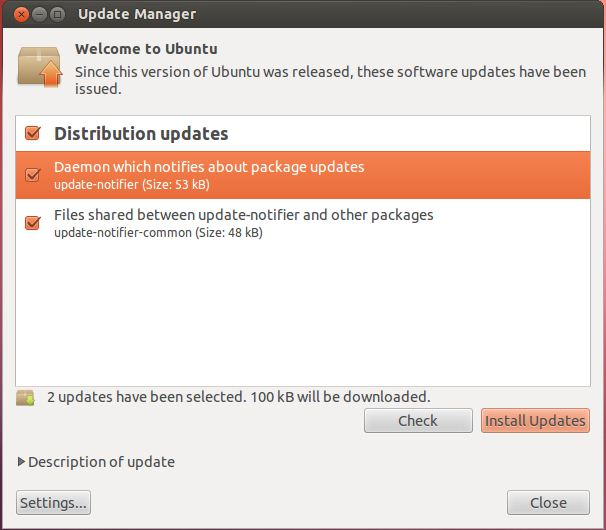
- Update Manager in Ubuntu 12.04 LTS showing updates that are available to install
- Developer: Canonical Ltd.
- Stable release: 0.156.14 / 30 November 2016; 9 years ago
- Written in: Python
- Operating system: Linux
- Type: Package Manager
- License: GPL/LGPL
- Website: launchpad.net/update-manager
- Repository: code.launchpad.net/update-manager

In several Linux operating systems, the Software Updater program updates installed software and their associated packages with important software updates for security or with recommended patches. It also informs users when updates are available, listing them in alphabetical order for users to choose which updates to install, if any. It was originally written for Ubuntu, although it is now part of other APT-based systems.

The application was originally called Update Manager; it was announced in May 2012 that starting with Ubuntu 12.10 the name would change to Software Updater to better describe its functions. Technically the rename only affected the GUI; the name of the APT package containing the application, the executable file itself, and internally the software itself, still use the name update-manager.

The Software Updater cannot uninstall updates, although this can be accomplished by other package managers such as Ubuntu Software Center and more technically advanced ones such as Synaptic.

In Ubuntu, the Software Updater can update the operating system to new versions which are released every six months for standard releases or every two years for Long Term Support releases. This functionality is included by default in the desktop version but needs to be added to the server version.

== Distributions that use the Software Updater ==
- Kubuntu
- Ubuntu
- Ubuntu GNOME
- Ubuntu Kylin
- Ubuntu MATE
- Xubuntu
- Zorin OS

== See also ==
- Advanced Packaging Tool
- KPackage
- Package management system
- Synaptic (software)
- Ubuntu Software Center
