= Ask Ubuntu =

Website

- Screenshot of Ask Ubuntu, December 2013
- Website type: Question & answer
- Available in: English
- Owners: Stack Exchange, Inc.
- Creator: Community-authored
- Website: askubuntu.com
- Commercial: Yes
- Registration: Optional (required to track reputation) (Note: Whole Stack Exchange network uses the same accounts, however, each site tracks reputations separately.)
- Launched: October 2010
- Current status: Online

Ask Ubuntu is a community-driven question and answer website for the Ubuntu operating system. It is part of the Stack Exchange Network, running the same software as Stack Overflow.

Members gain reputation based on the community's response (through voting) to their questions and answers. Reputation signifies trust for users in the answers they give. Privileges are given based on reputation levels, with users with the highest reputation having similar privileges to moderators. All the user-generated content is licensed under a Creative Commons Attribution-ShareAlike license.

The site came out of public beta on 10 October 2010, launching alongside Ubuntu 10.10.

As of December 2021, Ask Ubuntu has about 1.3 million registered users and more than 380,000 questions.

== History ==
Old Ask Ubuntu logo used until sometime in 2021

Ask Ubuntu came into existence as a "Proposed Q&A site for Ubuntu users and developers" on the Stack Exchange Area 51. With other Internet users supporting the proposal of the site through "commitment", Stack Exchange chose to launch Ask Ubuntu in private beta. Eventually, the site came out of public beta with the name Ask Ubuntu, which was chosen through a community voting process, and was launched alongside Ubuntu 10.10 Maverick Meerkat in October 2010.

Despite the Stack Exchange policy against fragmentation, after deliberation and voting, Ask Ubuntu was allowed to continue alongside a separate 'Linux and Unix' site.

Ask Ubuntu has received help from Canonical Ltd., which has allowed the site to use their trademark. Canonical Ltd has also helped in the designing of the site, ensuring that Ask Ubuntu's theme follows the Ubuntu brand guidelines.

== Format ==
The website allows the users to ask and answer questions. The users are given the ability to vote the questions and answers up or down. They can also earn reputation points and "badges" for their various contributions to the site. For example, a person is rewarded with 10 reputation points if their answer for a question receives an "up" vote.

All users can submit edits to the questions and answers in a wiki style, and their suggested edits go through a peer review process. Users with 2,000 reputation points or more can edit the questions and answers directly, without having their edits go through a similar peer review process. Some posts are designated as "community wiki", which have a lower reputation requirement for editing.

Ask Ubuntu has two sub-sites: a "meta" where users can ask and answer questions about the site itself, and a set of real time chat rooms as part of the Stack Exchange network of sites.
