= Ubuntu-restricted-extras =

Software package for Ubuntu

Ubuntu Restricted Extras
- Developer: various
- Stable release: 67
- Platform: Ubuntu (Linux)
- Available in: English
- License: Various (Ubuntu MOTU Developers)
- Website: Ubuntu wiki RestrictedFormats

Ubuntu Restricted Extras is a software package for the computer operating system Ubuntu that allows the user to install essential software which is not already included due to legal or copyright reasons.

It is a meta-package that installs:

- Support for MP3 and unencrypted DVD playback
- Microsoft TrueType core fonts
- Adobe Flash plugin
- codecs for common audio and video files

== Background ==
The software in this package is not included in Ubuntu by default, as Ubuntu maintainers wish to include only completely free software in out-of-the-box installations. Included packages may be closed-source, encumbered by software patents, or otherwise restricted. For example, the Adobe Flash plugin is a closed-source piece of software. Additionally, many multimedia formats such as MP3 and H.264 are patented. In countries where these patents apply, legally distributing software that use these formats may require paying licensing fees to the patent owners.

== Contents ==
The Ubuntu Restricted Extras is a metapackage and has the following dependencies:

- flashplugin-installer
- gstreamer0.10-ffmpeg
- gstreamer0.10-fluendo-mp3
- gstreamer0.10-pitfdll
- gstreamer0.10-plugins-bad
- gstreamer0.10-plugins-ugly
- gstreamer0.10-plugins-bad-multiverse
- gstreamer0.10-plugins-ugly-multiverse
- icedtea6-plugin
- libavcodec-extra-52
- libmp4v2-0
- ttf-mscorefonts-installer
- unrar

Starting with Ubuntu 10.10, several of these dependencies are included indirectly via another meta-package ubuntu-restricted-addons which is included by default.

== Inclusion ==
Due to the legal status of the software included in Ubuntu Restricted Extras, the package is not included by default on any Ubuntu CDs.

== See also ==
- deb format
