= Snap (software) =

Software deployment system for Linux by Canonical

- Developer: Canonical Ltd.
- Written in: Go, C, Shell script, Python, JavaScript, NASL
- Operating system: Linux
- License: GNU GPLv3 (Client & Runtime), Proprietary (Backend)
- Website: snapcraft.io

Snap is a software packaging and deployment system developed by Canonical for operating systems that use the Linux kernel and the systemd init system. The packages, called snaps, and the tool for using them, snapd, work across a range of Linux distributions and allow upstream software developers to distribute their applications directly to users. Snaps are self-contained applications running in a sandbox with mediated access to the host system.

== Functionality ==
=== Configurable sandbox ===
Applications in a Snap run in a container with limited access to the host system. Using Interfaces, users can give an application mediated access to additional features of the host such as recording audio, accessing USB devices and recording video. These interfaces mediate regular Linux APIs so that applications can function in the sandbox without needing to be rewritten. Desktop applications can also use the XDG Desktop Portals, a standardized API originally created by the Flatpak project (originally called xdg-app) to give sandboxed desktop applications access to host resources. These portals often provide a better user experience compared to the native Linux APIs because they prompt the user for permission to use resources such as a webcam at the time the application uses them. The downside is that applications and toolkits need to be rewritten in order to use these newer APIs.

The Snap sandbox also supports sharing data and Unix sockets between Snaps. This is often used to share common libraries and application frameworks between Snaps to reduce the size of Snaps by avoiding duplication.

The Snap sandbox heavily relies on the AppArmor Linux Security Module from the upstream Linux kernel. Because only one "major" Linux Security Module (LSM) can be active at the same time, the Snap sandbox is much less secure when another major LSM is enabled. As a result, on distributions such as Fedora which enable SELinux by default, the Snap sandbox is heavily degraded. Although Canonical is working with many other developers and companies to make it possible for multiple LSMs to run at the same time, in 2020 this solution was still a long time away.

=== Automatic and atomic updates ===
Multiple times a day, snapd checks for available updates of all Snaps and installs them in the background using an atomic operation. Updates can be reverted and use delta encoding to reduce their download size.

Publishers can release and update multiple versions of their software in parallel using channels. Each channel has a specific track and risk, which indicate the version and stability of the software released on that channel. When installing an application, Snap defaults to using the latest/stable channel, which will automatically update to new major releases of the software when they become available. Publishers can create additional channels to give users the possibility to stick to specific major releases of their software. For example, a 2.0/stable channel would allow users to stick to the 2.0 version of the software and only get minor updates without the risk of backwards incompatible changes. When the publisher releases a new major version in a new channel, users can manually update to the next version when they choose.

The schedule, frequency and timing of automatic updates can be configured by users. Users can also pause automatic updates for a certain period of time, or indefinitely. Updates are automatically paused on metered connections.

=== Snapcraft ===
Snapcraft
- Developer: Canonical Ltd.
- Stable release: 9.2.1 / 20 October 2026; 18 days ago
- Written in: Python, Shell script, C++, Go, Dart
- Operating system: Linux
- License: GNU General Public License, version 3.0
- Website: snapcraft.io
- Repository: github.com/snapcore/snapcraft

Snapcraft is a tool for developers to package their programs in the Snap format. It runs on any Linux distribution supported by Snap, macOS and Microsoft Windows. Snapcraft builds the packages in a Virtual Machine using Multipass, in order to ensure the result of a build is the same, regardless of which distribution or operating system it is built on. Snapcraft supports multiple build tools and programming languages, such as Go, Java, JavaScript, Python, C/C++ and Rust. It also allows importing application metadata from multiple sources such as AppStream, git, shell scripts and setup.py files.

=== Snap Store ===
The Snap Store allows developers to publish their snap-packaged applications. All apps uploaded to the Snap Store undergo automatic testing, including a malware scan. However, the scan does not catch all issues. In one case in May 2018, two applications by the same developer were found to contain a cryptocurrency miner which ran in the background during application execution. In 2024, fake cryptocurrency wallets were uploaded that would steal the user's funds, and then when taken down by Canonical, simply reuploaded by a new account. Canonical recommends users only install Snaps from publishers trusted by the user.

== Support ==
Snaps are self-contained packages that work across a range of Linux distributions. This is unlike traditional Linux package management approaches, which require specifically adapted packages for each Linux distribution.

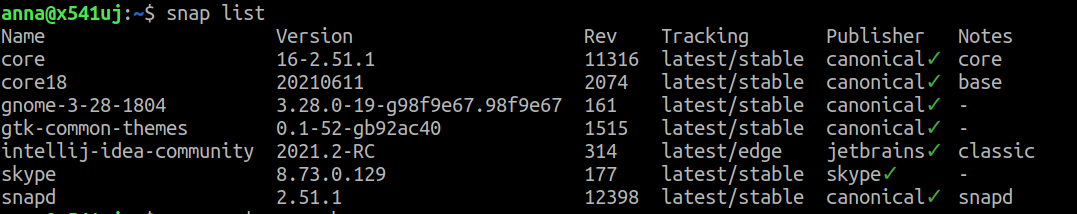
The command snap list here shows that Skype and IntelliJ IDEA have been installed

The snap file format is a single compressed filesystem using the SquashFS format with the extension .snap. This filesystem contains the application, libraries it depends on, and declarative metadata. This metadata is interpreted by snapd to set up an appropriately shaped secure sandbox for that application. After installation, the snap is mounted by the host operating system and decompressed on the fly when the files are used. Although this has the advantage that snaps use less disk space, it also means some large applications start more slowly.

Snap supports any class of Linux application such as desktop applications, server tools, IoT apps and even system services such as the printer driver stack. To ensure this, Snap relies on systemd for features such as running socket-activated system services in a Snap. This causes Snap to work best only on distributions that can adopt that init system.

== Adoption ==
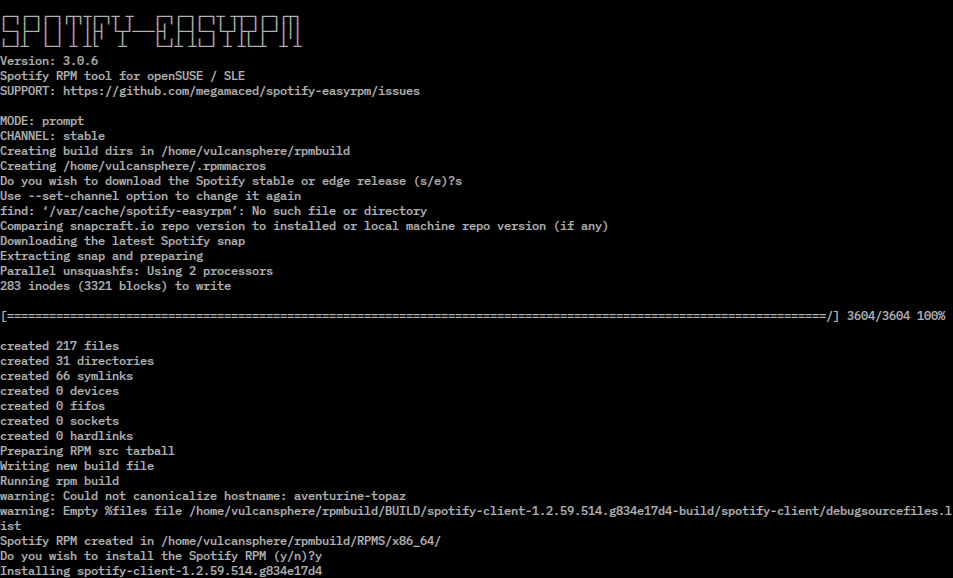
Screenshot of Spotify-EasyRPM installation script running on openSUSE Tumbleweed, the script downloaded the Spotify Linux Snap package from snapcraft.io, processed and converted the package into RPM, and installed the RPM into the system

Snap initially only supported the all-Snap Ubuntu Core distribution, but in June 2016, it was ported to a wide range of Linux distributions to become a format for universal Linux packages. Snap requires Systemd which is available in most, but not all, Linux distributions. Other Unix-like systems (e.g. FreeBSD) are not supported. ChromeOS does not support Snap directly, only through Linux distributions installed in it that support Snap, such as Gallium OS.

Ubuntu and its official derivatives pre-install Snap by default, as well as other Ubuntu-based distributions such as KDE Neon, and Zorin OS. Solus have currently planned to drop Snap, to reduce the burden of maintaining AppArmor patches needed for strict Snap confinement. Zorin OS have removed Snap as a default package in the Zorin OS 17 release. While other official Ubuntu derivatives such as Kubuntu, Xubuntu, and Ubuntu MATE have also shipped with the competing Flatpak as a complement, they will no longer do so beginning with Ubuntu 23.04, meaning that it must be installed manually by the user.

A number of notable desktop software development companies publish their software in the Snap Store, including Google, JetBrains, KDE, Microsoft (for Linux versions of e.g. .NET Core 3.1, Visual Studio Code, Skype, and PowerShell), Mozilla and Spotify. Snaps are also used in Internet-of-Things environments, ranging from consumer-facing products to enterprise device management gateways and satellite communication networks. Finally, Snap is also used by developers of server applications such as InfluxDB, Kata Containers, Nextcloud and Travis CI.

== Reception ==
Clément Lefèbvre, founder and project leader of Linux Mint, criticized Snap, arguing that Canonical controls the distribution of software and makes its store a requirement for Snap users. In 2020, the Linux Mint project announced that its releases would not ship with snap software and would not allow snap packages to be installed automatically via APT.

On recent versions of Ubuntu, Canonical has migrated certain packages exclusively to Snap, such as Chromium and Firefox web browsers. The replacement of Firefox led to mixed reception from users due to performance issues with the Snap version, especially on startup.

== See also ==
- Flatpak
- AppImage
- Nix
- Portable application creators
- ROX uses directories (AppDirs) as application bundles.
- List of Linux package management systems
