= PackageKit =

Free software

- PackageKit is a system daemon, various graphical front-ends are available
- Original author: Richard Hughes
- Developers: Richard Hughes, Matthias Klumpp, multiple backend maintainers
- Release: 2007; 19 years ago
- Stable release: 1.3.6 / 16 June 2026; 2 months ago
- Written in: C, C++, Python
- Operating system: Linux
- Type: Package management system
- License: GNU General Public License
- Website: www.freedesktop.org/software/PackageKit/
- Repository: github.com/PackageKit/PackageKit

PackageKit is a free and open-source suite of software applications designed to provide a consistent and high-level abstraction layer for a number of different package management systems. PackageKit was created by Richard Hughes in 2007, and first embedded in an operating system as a default application in May 2008, with the release of Fedora 9.

The suite is cross-platform, though it is primarily targeted at Linux distributions which follow the interoperability standards set out by the freedesktop.org group. It uses the software libraries provided by the D-Bus and Polkit projects to handle inter-process communication and privilege negotiation respectively.

PackageKit seeks to introduce automatic updates without having to authenticate as root, fast-user-switching, warnings translated into the correct locale, common upstream GNOME and KDE tools and one software over multiple Linux distributions.

== Software architecture ==
PackageKit runs as a system-activated daemon, named packagekitd, which abstracts out differences between the different systems. A library called libpackagekit allows other programs to interact with PackageKit.

Features include:

- installing local files, ServicePack media and packages from remote sources
- authorization using Polkit
- the use of existing packaging tools
- multi-user system awareness – it will not allow shutdown in critical parts of the transaction
- a system-activated daemon which exits when not in use

=== Front-ends ===
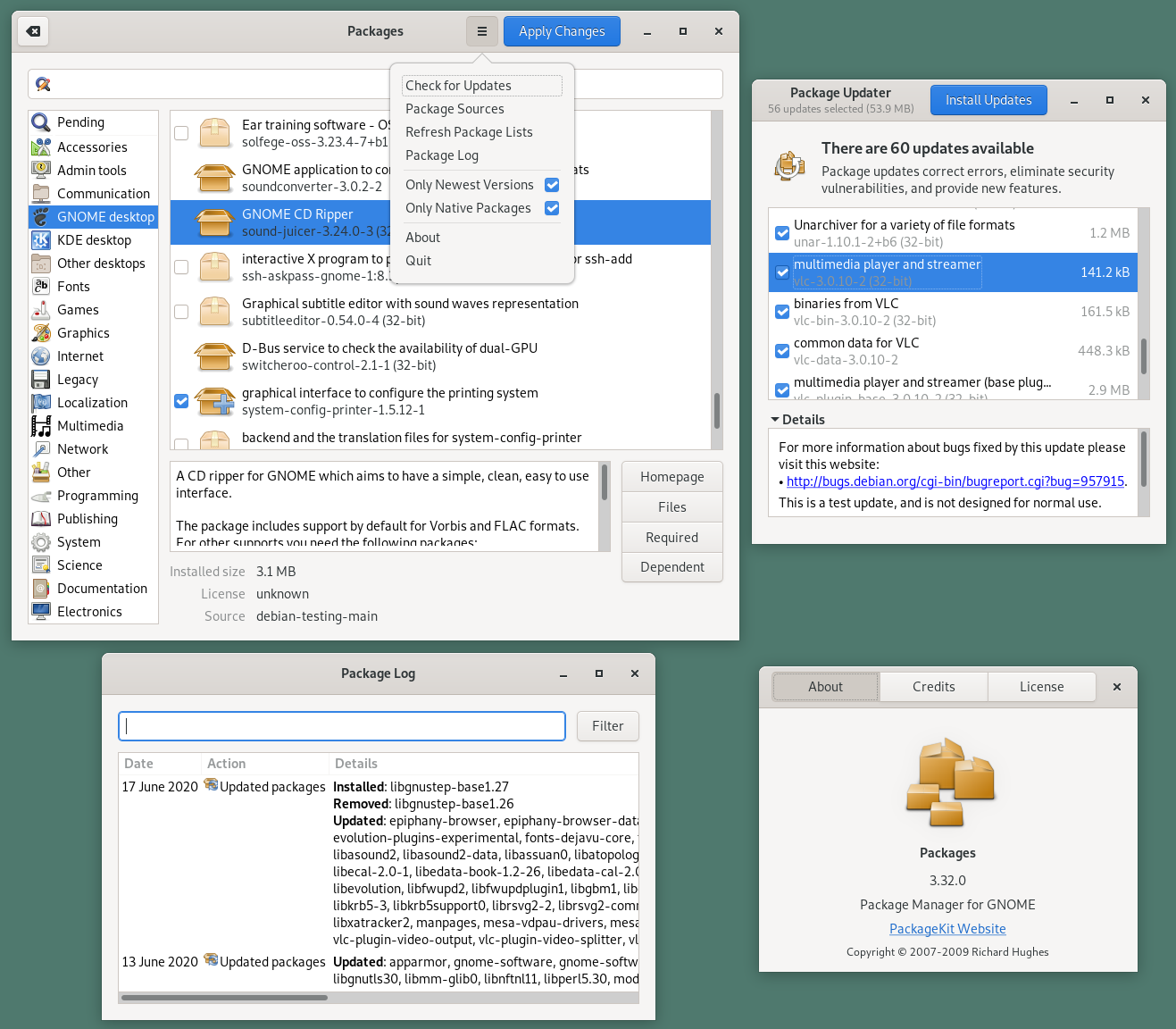
gnome-packagekit 3.32 (released in 2019-03)

- pkgcli is the official front-end of PackageKit, it operates from the command line.
- pkcon the older command-line interface of PackageKit.

GTK-based:

- gnome-packagekit is an official GNOME front-end for PackageKit. Unlike GNOME Software, gnome-packagekit can handle all packages, not just applications, and has advanced features that are missing in GNOME Software as of June 2020.
- GNOME Software is a utility for installing the applications and updates on Linux. It is part of the GNOME Core Applications and was introduced in GNOME 3.10.

Qt-based:

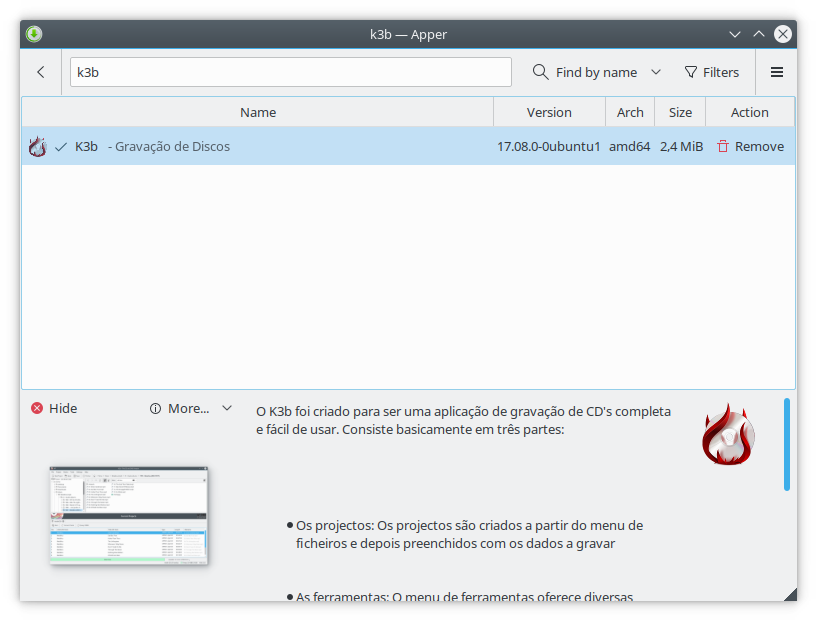
Apper

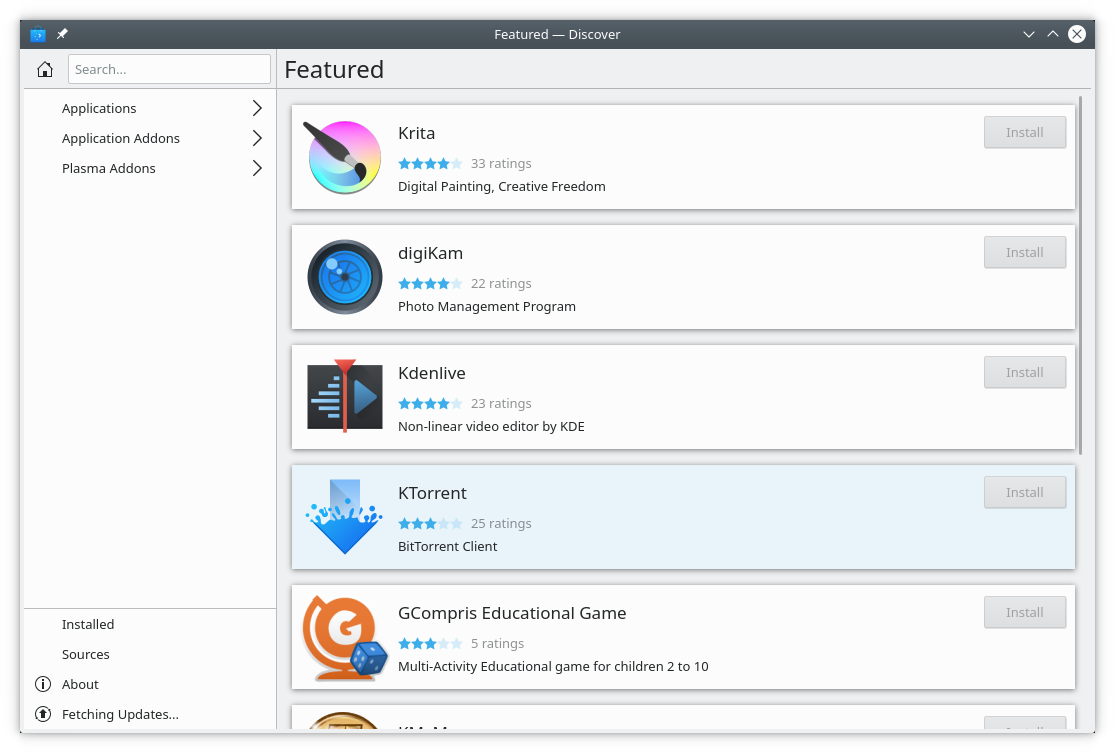
Discover

=== Back-ends ===
A number of different package management systems (known as back-ends) support different abstract methods and signals used by the front-end tools. Supported back-ends include:

- Advanced Packaging Tool (APT)
- Conary
- libdnf & librepo, the libraries upon which DNF, (the successor to YUM) builds
- Entropy
- Opkg
- pacman
- PiSi
- Portage
- Smart Package Manager
- urpmi
- YUM
- ZYpp

== See also ==
- AppStream
- Listaller
- Polkit
- Red Carpet
- Software Updater
- List of Linux package management systems
