= Flatpak =

Linux software deployment utility

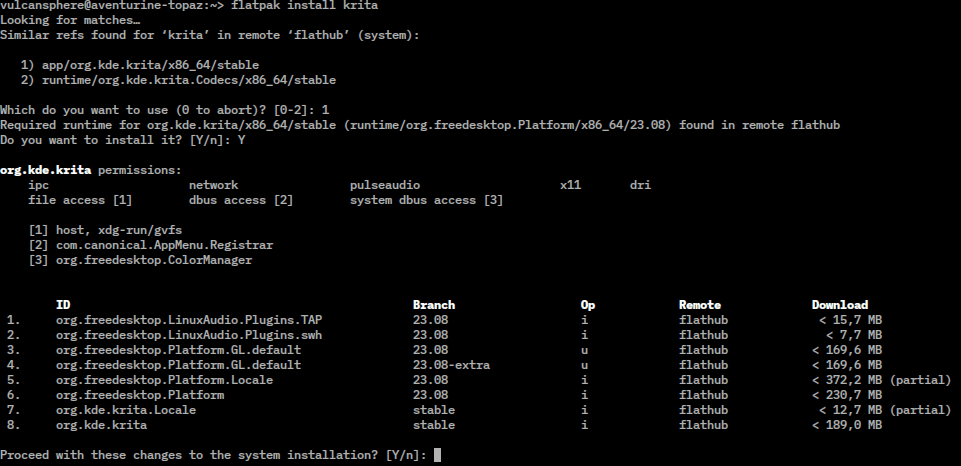
- Example of installing Krita from Flathub with Flatpak CLI
- Original author: Alexander Larsson
- Developer: Flatpak Team
- Release: September 2015; 11 years ago
- Stable release: 1.18.4 / 28 September 2026; 40 days ago
- Written in: C
- Operating system: Linux
- License: LGPL-2.1-or-later
- Website: Flatpak; Flathub
- Repository: github.com/flatpak/flatpak

Flatpak (formerly xdg-app) is a software packaging and deployment system made for Linux. It provides a sandbox environment in which users can run application software, or “apps”, in isolation from the rest of the system. Flatpak also enables developers to push updates directly to users, without having to package and test the application separately for each distribution.

== Functionality ==
=== Installation ===
Flatpak applications can be installed either system-wide or user-wide. This means that a user is able to install any flatpak application, even without any admin privileges.

Flatpak applications generally contain AppStream data, which is metadata about the pieces of software they provide (e.g. description, categories, dependencies). They are in the form of metainfo files, which are small XML files.

Users can also install Flatpak applications directly from source, instead of installing from flatpak repositories. Supported filetypes include:

- .flatpak files, which are single-file bundles (note that it doesn't dependencies or AppStream data),
- .flatpakref files, which are application descriptions, and
- OCI images.

=== Configurable sandbox ===
Applications using Flatpak are sandboxed, meaning they need permissions to access resources such as sound (via PipeWire), network, and files. The default permissions that the Flatpak application use are configured by the maintainers of the Flatpak, and they can be overridden by users on their system.

Because Flatpak runs in a sandbox, which provides a separate ABI-stable version of common system libraries and operating system interfaces, it uses more space on the system than common native packages. To solve this, Flatpak uses OSTree, which deduplicates matching files. This means that the first few Flatpak installations will occupy more space, but as more packages are added, the system will use space more efficiently.

=== Repositories ===
Flathub, a centralized repository (or remote source in the Flatpak terminology), is the de facto standard for installing Flatpak applications. Packages are contributed by both Flathub administrators and application developers. To get into Flathub, the applications must meet Flathub's requirements. Administrators can prevent applications from being merged into Flathub at any point during or after the submission and review process.

Applications can be verified when Flathub administrators confirm that an application's ID is owned by the developer or an authorized party. On the Flathub website, there will be a blue tick on the application's page if it is verified.

Users can add their own remotes; the Flatpak documentations recommends users to use .flatpakrepo files, which contain details about the remote and its GPG key. Users can also host their own Flatpak repositories that are independent of Flathub.

By November of 2026, Flathub had 3,760 apps, 2,219 of which were verified. Flathub had more than a million users and 4.9 billion downloads. Cassidy James Blaede attributed this to the adoption of Flatpak by well-known companies and Linux distributions, and the newly made verification system.

== Support ==
Other than a few edge cases, Flatpak apps can be installed on any Linux distribution, including those installed with the Windows Subsystem for Linux compatibility layer, so long as bubblewrap and OSTree are available.

It can also be used on Linux kernel-based systems like ChromeOS.

== See also ==
- List of software package management systems
- AppImage
- Snap
