= SuperX =

- Developer: Libresoft Technology Pvt. Ltd.
- OS family: Linux (Unix-like)
- Working state: Discontinued
- Source model: Open source
- Latest release: 5.0 / 2 May 2019; 7 years ago
- Available in: Multilingual
- Update method: APT (front-ends available)
- Package manager: dpkg (front-ends like Synaptic available)
- Supported platforms: i386, AMD64
- Kernel type: Monolithic (Linux kernel)
- Userland: GNU
- Default user interface: KDE Plasma
- License: Mainly the GNU GPL and various other free software licenses
- Official website: superxos.com

SuperX is a Linux distribution, a computer operating system originally developed in India. SuperX uses a tweaked version of KDE and is aimed towards beginners and casual users. SuperX features a new launcher made in QML that allows users to get a grid view of all icons of the installed applications in the system, the new launcher is called "SuperX App Launcher".

== Name ==
The name SuperX is an acronym which describes the goals of the distribution.

SuperX stands for "Simple, User friendly, Powerful, Energetic and Robust eXperience".

== Features ==
A default installation of SuperX contains a wide range of software that includes LibreOffice, Firefox, Ktorrent, and several lightweight games such as Kpatience and Kacman Many additional software packages are accessible from the built in SuperX Appstore as well as any other APT-based package management tools. Many additional software packages that are no longer installed by default, are still accessible in the repositories still installable by the main tool or by any other APT-based package management tool. Cross-distribution snap packages and flatpaks are also available, that both allow installing software. The default file manager is Dolphin

All of the application software installed by default is free software. In addition, SuperX redistributes some hardware drivers that are available only in binary format, but such packages are clearly marked in the restricted component.

== Technical Details ==
SuperXos
Software
Kernel and core	Linux kernel and KDE Neon core
Graphics	X.Org Server / Wayland
Sound	PulseAudio
Multimedia	GStreamer
Window manager	KWin
Desktop	Plasma Desktop (Modified)
Primary toolkit	Qt
Browser	Firefox
Office suite	LibreOffice
Email and PIM	Thunderbird

== History ==
SuperX was first developed in Guwahati, the capital city of Assam in India by a high school student named Wrishiraj Kausik in 2007. Later he released the first public version of SuperX in 2011 and started a company to support and promote SuperX called Libresoft (Libresoft Technology Pvt. Ltd.). Libresoft along with its supporters, funds the development of SuperX and provides support to the users. Libresoft also organizes various public events to spread awareness about open-source software and computers in general.

Its first formal release, SuperX 1.0 "Galileo", was released to selected users on April 24, 2011, and was made available to the public as a free download on October 8, 2011. The second release, SuperX v1.1 "Cassini" was released on June 21, 2012. It is an LTS version with 5 years of support.

The latest version is 5.0 "Lamarr" which was released on May 2, 2019, based on Ubuntu 18.04 and KDE Neon code base. It features a highly modified KDE workspace. Version 5.0 updates in a much slower and predictable rate and thus Qt and KDE libraries may not be binary compatible with KDE Neon.

It comes with 4 years of security, maintenance and standard support of all the packages and will be supported until April 2023.

== Funding ==
SuperX is a self-funded project of Libresoft Technology Pvt. Ltd. In 2017, Libresoft Technology Pvt. Ltd. and Assam Electronics Development Corporation Ltd. (AMTRON), the nodal agency for Government of Assam, signed a Memorandum of Understanding to distribute and deploy SuperX across the state of Assam, giving Libresoft the contract for paid support services.

== Application Installation ==
SuperX is based on KDE Neon which in turn is based on Ubuntu 18.04, which means it supports most applications available for Ubuntu 18.04 and also follows the same commands as Ubuntu. It also ships with support for snaps and flatpacks out of the box. SuperX also have its own Appstore which has a graphical interface to install and remove apps. However the repositories of SuperX are not 100% sync with Neon due to difference in release cycle.

== System requirements ==
The recommended minimum system requirements for a desktop installation are as follows:

Desktop and laptop
Required
Processor	2 GHz dual core (x86)
Memory	4 GB
Hard drive capacity	25 GB
Video card	VGA @ 1024×768

== Release history ==
The following is the release history for SuperX:

Color	Meaning
Red	Discontinued release
Yellow	Old release
Green	Current Stable release

Version	Date	Notes
1.0 "Galileo"	2011-10-08	Based on Ubuntu 11.04 codebase, KDE 4.6
1.1 "Cassini"	2012-06-21	Based on Ubuntu 12.04 codebase, KDE 4.8, LTS release
2.0 "Darwin"	2013-05-23	Based on SuperX 1.1 codebase, KDE 4.10, New Development model adopted
2.1 "Ada"	2013-10-27	Minor update to Darwin, direct upgrade possible from Darwin
3.0 "Grace"	2015-03-23	Based on Ubuntu 14.04 code base, features a highly modified KDE workspace
5.0 "Lamarr"	2019-05-02	Based on Ubuntu 18.04 code base, Linux Kernel 5.4, Plasma 5.17.5
