= Debian build toolchain =

Set of programming tools for deploy packages for Debian repositories

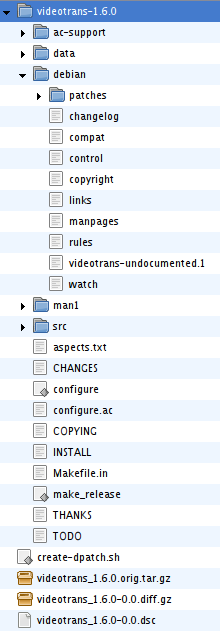
A typical input of the Debian build tools: three files constituting the source package (the bottom) and the unpacked source tree with a debian subdirectory added there by the package maintainer.

The Debian build toolchain is a collection of software utilities used to create Debian source packages (.dsc) and Debian binary packages (.deb files) from upstream source tarballs.

These tools are used in the Debian project and also in Debian-based distributions such as Ubuntu.

== Overview ==
Source code for free software is typically distributed in compressed tar archives called tarballs. Debian is a binary-oriented distribution, meaning that its deb packages include precompiled binaries and data files arranged into a file system hierarchy that the software expects. The Debian build toolchain thus needs instructions on how to use the upstream build system to build correct deb packages.

These instructions are stored in the debian subdirectory, which is added to the source tree for the software being packaged by the package maintainer. While it is possible to build the package directly from the modified source tree, it is standard practice to create source packages, which contain the changes the maintainer made to the upstream sources in redistributable form.

== Source packages ==
A typical Debian source package consists of three files:

- The original tarball (orig.tar) — a mere copy of the upstream source tarball if it is in tar format and no changes are necessary, or a repacked tarball. The latter can happen if it contains a snapshot from a version control system that was never released in tarball form, or if the maintainer needs to remove files not compatible with the Debian Free Software Guidelines.
- The debian.tar file, which contains changes to the upstream source made by the package maintainer. This includes the entire debian directory. Any modified files outside it are aggregated into patch files inside the debian/patches directory, that are automatically applied before building.
- The dsc file, which is a text file with metadata, such as the names of all files constituting the source package and their SHA256 checksums. It also contains the signature of the creator of the source package.

For example, a source package named foo with upstream version 1.2.3 and Debian revision 4 can consist of the following files:

- foo_1.2.3.orig.tar.gz
- foo_1.2.3-4.debian.tar.gz
- foo_1.2.3-4.dsc

A source package is created using the dpkg-buildpackage tool or its wrapper debuild. When invoked to create a source package, dpkg-buildpackage calls the maintainer's rules to clean the source tree of any intermediate files, does various sanity checks, and finally, signs the dsc file with the packager's key using the debsign utility.

The reverse process — producing the unpacked source tree from a source package — is accomplished using the dpkg-source utility, which extracts the original tarball to a subdirectory, extracts the debian.tar tarball inside it, and applies any quilt patches present. This is the first step that a build system does when building binary packages from a source package.

Older source packages (using Source Format 1) have a .diff.gz file instead of the debian.tar. This is a unified diff that contains the debian directory and any changes to the upstream source that aren't managed by a patch system.

== The debian directory ==
The debian directory contains files used by dpkg-buildpackage to create both binary and source packages. Unlike RPM, which uses a single spec file for instructions, the Debian tools use an entire subdirectory with multiple files. Three files are required at minimum to correctly build a package — changelog, control and rules. A fourth file, copyright, is mandated by the Debian policy, but is a legal requirement rather than a technical one.

By design, all files in the debian directory are text files, most of which are human-readable and edited with a simple text editor.

=== debian/changelog ===
This file contains information about all versions of the package since it was created. The build tools only process the top entry, which is used to determine the package version, urgency (which is only of relevance to Debian itself), and bugs in the distribution that this release fixes.

For example, for a package named foo, an example debian/changelog entry can read like this:

foo (1.2.3-1) unstable; urgency=low

  * New upstream release.
  * Dropped 02_manpage_hyphens.dpatch, fixed upstream.
  * Added 04_edit_button_crash.dpatch: fix a crash after pressing the edit button. (Closes: #654321)
  * debian/control: foo should conflict with libbar. (Closes: #987654)

 -- John Doe <jdoe@example.com>  Fri, 30 Nov 2007 15:29:42 +0100

Debian provides two main utilities for manipulating the debian/changelog file:

- dch is used to add new entries to the changelog or modify existing ones.
- dpkg-parsechangelog parses the most recent entry and extracts data from it in a Key: value format similar to debian/control. It is primarily used in scripts.

=== debian/control ===
This file contains information about the source package and all binary packages it builds (there can be more than one; for example, the source package libbar can serve as the source for binary packages libbar0, which contains just the shared library, and libbar-dev, which contains a static version of the library and header files).

It lists (among others) such things as the package name, maintainer, target architectures (for binary packages), build dependencies (packages that must be installed for the package to successfully build) and dependencies (packages that must be installed for the package to function properly when installed).

=== debian/rules ===
This file is a script that is invoked by dpkg-buildpackage with a single argument that specifies the action to take (clean, build, install, binary). Although it can technically be any kind of script, it is always implemented as a makefile.

Apart from invoking the upstream build system, most instructions in debian/rules are highly repetitive and ubiquitous, and thus, virtually all debian/rules files wrap this functionality in debhelper scripts. For example, automatically determining the dependencies based on shared libraries used is a very common action, and thus, instead of including the code necessary to do it, the debian/rules file simply calls dh_shlibdeps. Other examples of debhelper scripts include dh_installdocs, which installs stock documentation files such as debian/copyright into their appropriate locations, or dh_fixperms, which ensures that files in the package have correct access rights (for example, executables in /usr/bin have the "executable" bit set, but are only writable by the superuser).

Since sequences of debhelper scripts are themselves repetitive, some packages simplify debian/rules files directly by using dh or CDBS instead of running each debhelper command directly.

== Patch systems ==
Sometimes, a maintainer needs to modify the original source. While, in the past, this was often done simply by editing the files in place and including the changes in the diff.gz, this could make maintenance difficult when new upstream versions were released, because all the changes had to be examined and merged when necessary.

The newer source format, 3.0 (quilt), uses the quilt patch system, to allow the modifications to be broken into groups of logically separated patches, each of which deals with one change and can be sent upstream as is. These patches live in debian/patches.

There are also packages using other patch systems, such as dpatch. It generates and executes shell scripts that are non-standard unified diff files with a header, which nevertheless are compatible with the standard diff utility. The debian/rules file is modified to call dpatch apply-all before building the binary package and dpatch deapply-all before building the source package (and cleaning up any build byproducts). quilt and certain other patch systems eliminate the need for special headers and use standard diff files.

== Tracking changes in source packages: debdiff and interdiff ==
Sometimes a user may want to look at differences between two source packages — for example, to generate a proposed patch against the version currently in the repository for inclusion in the distribution's bug tracking system. If both packages use the same upstream version, this can done using the debdiff tool, which produces differences between two source trees with packaging changes included.

If the upstream tarballs for the two versions are different, such a naive comparison cannot be used. Instead, the interdiff utility can be used to produce a diff between two diff files (in this case, between two diff.gz files). A drawback is that an interdiff output requires more effort to apply, and the one applying the changes must also find and download the newer upstream tarball, which is typically done using the get-orig-source rule in debian/rules.

== Sanity checks with lintian ==
This tool provides automated checks for common packaging mistakes in both binary and source packages, including Debian policy violations and potential compatibility problems.

While a maintainer typically aims to correct all issues pointed out by lintian, different distributions can have different policies regarding them. For example, Ubuntu requires all packages originating in Ubuntu to be clean, but for a package merged into Ubuntu from Debian, there is no such requirement: new changes should simply not introduce any warnings in addition to existing ones. This is done to minimize the divergence between Debian and Ubuntu packages.

Here are example lintian outputs:

W: foo source: source-contains-CVS-dir config/CVS
N:
N:   Package contains a CVS directory. It was most likely included by
N:   accident, since transient CVS data usually doesn't belong in packages.
N:   Export from CVS rather than use a checkout.
N:

W: libfoo-dev: debian-changelog-line-too-long line 2
N:
N:   The given line of the latest changelog entry is over 80 columns. Such
N:   changelog entries may look poor in terminal windows and mail messages
N:   and be annoying to read. Please wrap changelog entries at 80 columns
N:   or less where possible.
N:

I: foo: arch-dep-package-has-big-usr-share 3399kB 77%
N:
N:   The package has a significant amount of architecture-independent data
N:   in /usr/share, while it is an architecture-dependent package. This is
N:   wasteful of mirror space and bandwidth, as we then end up with
N:   multiple copies of this data, one for each architecture.
N:   
N:   If the data in /usr/share is not architecture-independent, it is a
N:   policy violation, and in this case, you should move that data
N:   elsewhere.
N:   
N:   See also:
N:   http://www.debian.org/doc/developers-reference/ch-best-pkging-practice
N:   s#s-bpp-archindepdata

== Isolated build environments ==
Source packages are intended to be buildable on any installation of the target distribution version, provided that build dependencies are met. In addition, builds can be affected by packages already present in the system.

To verify that a package builds on any system, and to exclude any external factors, tools to create isolated build environments are used. These are pbuilder (Personal Builder) and sbuild.

These tools maintain minimal working systems in chroot, install only the necessary build dependencies listed in debian/control, and remove them when the build is finished. Therefore, using pbuilder, a package maintainer can detect if some build dependencies were not specified in debian/control. Also, pbuilder makes it possible to test-build for distributions other than the one the maintainer is running: for example, for the development version, while actually running the stable version.

sbuild is designed for integration with automated build daemons (buildd). It is used by Debian build servers, which automatically build binary packages for every supported architecture. The Launchpad service provides similar build daemons for Ubuntu, both the official distribution and personal package archives (PPAs).

== See also ==
- Deb (file format)
- dpkg
- lintian
