= Lintian =

Software package error and consistency checker for Debian

- Stable release: 2.115.3
- Repository: salsa.debian.org/lintian/lintian.git
- Operating system: Linux
- License: GNU General Public License
- Website: http://lintian.debian.org/

Lintian is a Debian package checker. It can be used to check binary and source packages for compliance with the Debian policy and for other common packaging errors.

Used in conjunction with dpkg, the Debian package management system. It checks Debian software packages for common inconsistencies and errors. As of Nov 10th 2022, the latest version complies to Debian standards version 4.6.0.1.

In 2009, the Debian FTP masters announced that they would use Lintian to automatically reject packages uploaded to Debian. They acknowledged that some of the issues diagnosed by Lintian had rare exceptions, which could be overridden by the maintainer. The idea to use Lintian as an automatic rejection mechanism was proposed already in 1998 by Christian Schwarz, when he announced the creation of Lintian.

Linda was another application that was intended to overcome many difficulties with Lintian. It was written in Python and was faster than current versions of Lintian. However, Lintian was better known and underwent many fixes to overcome past difficulties.

== See also ==
- dpkg
- deb (file format)
- Debian build toolchain
- lint, the original C language source code analysis program (Lintian is not based on lint source code)
