= Heirloom Project =

The Heirloom Project
- Developer: Gunnar Ritter
- Stable release: 070715 / July 15, 2007; 19 years ago
- Written in: C
- Operating system: Unix-like
- Available in: English
- License: Various, including CDDL
- Website: heirloom.sourceforge.net

The Heirloom Project is a collection of traditional Unix utilities. Most of them are derived from original Unix source code, as released as open-source by Caldera and Sun.

The project has the following components:

- The Heirloom Toolchest: awk, cpio, grep, tar, pax, etc.
- The Heirloom Bourne Shell sh
- The Heirloom Documentation Tools: nroff, troff, dpost, etc.
- The Heirloom Development Tools: lex, yacc, m4, and SCCS
- Heirloom mailx
- The Heirloom Packaging Tools: pkgadd, pkgmk, etc.

Although in general the intention of the project is to provide versions of Unix programs whose behavior mimics that of the classic versions, some improvements have been made. In particular, many of the Heirloom programs have been adapted to handle UTF-8 Unicode. Most programs have both a classic version and a POSIX conformant variant.
