= Debian configuration system =

Software utility in Debian-based Linux distributions

debconf
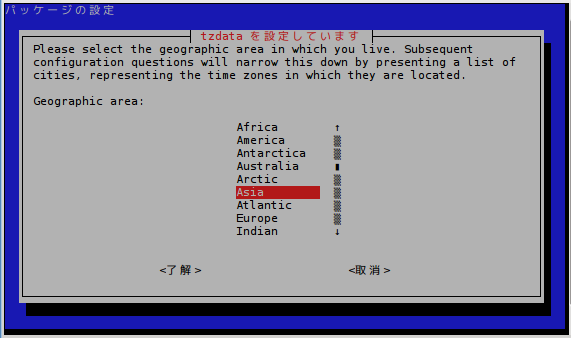
- Reconfigure tzdata package using debconf (1.5.38) on Debian Linux 6.0 (squeeze/unstable).
- Original author: Joey Hess
- Developers: Joey Hess, Colin Watson
- Repository: salsa.debian.org/pkg-debconf/debconf.git
- Written in: Perl
- Operating system: Unix-like operating system
- License: 2-clause BSD License

debconf is a software utility for performing system-wide configuration tasks on Unix-like operating systems. It is developed for the Debian Linux distribution, and is closely integrated with Debian's package management system, dpkg.

When packages are being installed, debconf asks the user questions which determine the contents of the system-wide configuration files associated with that package. After package installation, it is possible to go back and change the configuration of a package by using the dpkg-reconfigure program, or another program such as Synaptic.

The design of debconf allows for front-ends for answering configuration questions to be added in a modular way, and there exist several, such as one for dialog, one for readline, one that uses a text editor, one for KDE, one for GNOME, a Python front-end API, etc.

The original implementation of debconf is in Perl. During the development of Debian-Installer, a new implementation in C was developed, which is named cdebconf. The new implementation is currently only used in the installer, but is intended to eventually replace the original entirely. Both implementations make use of the same protocol for communication between the debconf front-end and the client code ("confmodule"); this is a simple line-based protocol similar to common Internet protocols.

Debconf does not physically configure any packages, but asks the user certain configuration questions stored in the .templates file, under the direction of the package's maintainer scripts (.config, .postinst, etc.). Typically, the .config script uses debconf to ask questions, while .postinst applies configuration changes to the unpacked package in reaction to the answers; however, this can vary due to technical requirements. The user's answers to the configuration questions asked by debconf are cached in debconf's database.
