= Libarchive =

Open-source archive and compression library

libarchive
- Release: 2003; 23 years ago
- Stable release: 3.8.10 / 14 October 2026
- Written in: C
- Operating system: cross-platform
- Type: library
- License: BSD License 2.0
- Website: libarchive.org
- Repository: github.com/libarchive/libarchive

libarchive is a free and open-source library for reading and writing various archive and compression formats. It is written in C and works on most Unix-like systems and Windows.

== History ==
libarchive's development was started in 2003 as part of the FreeBSD project. During the early years it was led by the FreeBSD project, but later it became an independent project. It was first released with FreeBSD 5.3 in November 2004.

== libarchive ==
libarchive automatically detects and reads archive formats. If the archive is compressed, libarchive also detects and handles compression formats before evaluating the archive. libarchive is designed to minimize the copying of data internally for optimal performance.

Supported archive formats:

- 7z – read and write
- ar – read and write
- cab – read only
- cpio – read and write
- ISO9660 – read and write
- lha & lzh – read only
- pax – read and write
- rar – read only
- shar – write only
- tar – read and write
- warc (ISO 28500:2009) – read and write
- xar – read and write
- zip – read and write

== Utilities ==
libarchive provides command-line utilities called bsdtar and bsdcpio. These are complete re-implementation based on libarchive. These are the default system tar and cpio on FreeBSD, NetBSD, macOS and Windows.

There is also bsdcat, designed to decompress a file to the standard output like zcat.

== Users ==
libarchive was originally developed for FreeBSD, but is also used in NetBSD and macOS as part of those operating systems.

bsdtar has been included in Windows since Windows 10 April 2018 Update. In May 2023, Microsoft announced Windows 11 will natively support additional archive formats such as 7z and RAR via libarchive.
