= Wajig =

- Original author: Graham J Williams
- Stable release: 2.14
- Written in: Python
- Operating system: Linux
- Type: Package management system
- License: GPLv2+
- Website: wajig.togaware.com

Wajig is a simplified wrapper to Debian's package management system dpkg/APT. Wajig provides the functionality of apt-get, dpkg, dpkg-deb, apt-cache and other tools. These tools launch as a subprocess. Wajig also provides extra functionality beyond that of the stock apt and dpkg tools. For example, the command wajig sizes provides a listing of all installed packages and the amount of disk space they require, from smallest to largest.

== Features ==
Wajig provides a consistent and intuitive interface to all packaging commands, unlike the traditional apt or dpkg package managers. Wajig serves as a wrapper for the underlying apt/dpkg commands.

wajig also provides a package install and removal log. This log provides an audit trail that help an administrator with diagnostics package diagnostics.

Wajig is written in Python, and is licensed under the GNU General Public License. The wajig package also includes a GUI front-end, called gjig, providing graphical buttons for most of the features.

== Gjig ==
Gnome-jig (gjig) provides a GNOME interface as part of the wajig package. While running gjig, hovering the mouse over the buttons provides a balloon with a clear description of the function that the button provides.

== See also ==
- PackageKit
