= Installwatch =

- Original author(s): Pancrazio 'Ezio' de Mauro
- Developer(s): Felipe Sánchez
- Stable release: 1.6.1 / November 1, 2006; 18 years ago
- Platform: Unix-like
- Type: Software management
- License: GNU General Public License
- Website: asic-linux.com.mx/~izto/checkinstall/installwatch.html

Installwatch is a program designed to make it easier to catalog and maintain software installed from source code. Originally developed as a stand-alone project, Installwatch now exists primarily as a component of CheckInstall.

Installwatch was originally written by Pancrazio 'Ezio' de Mauro in 1998, but development was later taken over by Felipe Sánchez.

== Functionality ==
Installwatch allows the user to monitor what files and directories are created during the installation of a software package in real-time. This allows the user to know exactly what has been installed on their system for the purposes of documentation and later removal of the software.

When used on its own Installwatch is of limited usefulness, as it can only create a log of the installation process. Because of this, Felipe Sánchez created CheckInstall; which takes the information generated by Installwatch and uses it to create an installable package which can be used on any Linux distribution that makes use of Debian, Slackware, or Red Hat package management systems.

The use of CheckInstall has largely superseded that of Installwatch alone, and as such Installwatch has now been merged with the CheckInstall distribution. Older stand-alone versions of Installwatch still remain primarily for historical and educational purposes.

== Coreutils incompatibility ==
At present, the version of Installwatch packaged with CheckInstall is incompatible with the current version of the GNU coreutils (Core Utilities). Because of this, Installwatch can't monitor any changes made with the coreutils, rendering its logs incomplete. Depending on the software package, this may completely invalidate the information provided by Installwatch and thus any program that depends on it (such as CheckInstall).

This issue was documented in the Slackware 12 changelog, and prompted CheckInstall's removal from that distribution. On August 3, 2007, the problem was further explained and detailed by Felipe Sánchez on the CheckInstall mailing list.

An updated version of CheckInstall was never delivered to address the issue, and a workaround is suggested.

== See also ==
- Advanced Packaging Tool
- RPM Package Manager
