= Application strings manager =

Software engineering tool

An application strings manager is a software tool primarily designed to optimize the download and storage of strings files used and produced in software development. It centralizes the management of all the product strings generated and used by an organization to overcome the complexity arising from the diversity of strings types, and their position in the overall content workflow.

== Uses ==
Application strings manager is a kind of software repository for text files, strings, and their corresponding keys. It can be used to store strings files produced by an organization itself, such as product content strings and UI content strings, or for third-party content which must be treated differently for both technical and workflow reasons.

=== Uses in software development ===
To manage the source files used in software development, organizations typically use revision control. The many source files used in software development are eventually built into the product strings (also known as "strings files") which constitute the components of a software product. Consequently, a software product may comprise hundreds and even thousands of individual product strings which must be managed in order to efficiently maintain a coherent and functional software product. This function of managing the product strings is done by an application strings manager. An application strings manager can be thought of as being to strings what revision control is to source files.

=== Strings managers ===
Some factors and features that may be offered by a strings manager include:

- Files manager to store files locally or on network storage
- Workflow
- High availability through having a redundant set of repository managers work against the same database or file storage
- User restrictions native to the strings manager or integrated with other organizational systems such as LDAP or Single Sign-On servers

=== Examples of Strings managers ===
- Twine
- cdocs
- Phrase

== String file formats ==
File Type	Extension	Resources
Android XML	.xml	Android Strings
CSV	.csv	CSV RFC
gettext	Classic standard .po	GNU gettext
HTML	.htm, .html	WC3 HTML
InDesign Markup	.idml	Adobe IDML
iOS Strings File	.strings	iOS Strings
iOS Stringsdict	.stringsdict	iOS Formats
JSON i18n	.json	Json.org JSON i18n
Java Properties	.properties	Java i18n
Office Open XML	.docx, .xlsx, .pptx	Open XML
Qt Linguist	.ts	Qt Manual
Text	.txt	Archive
XLIFF	.xliff, .xlf, .xml	Specification
XML	.xml	Standards
YAML	.yml	i18n Guide
YAMLi18n	,yml, yaml	YAMLi18n
Visual Studio	.resx	

== See also ==
- Software repository
- Software development
- gettext manages translations of user-interface message strings
