= Cpio =

File archiver and associated file format

cpio
- Original author: Dick Haight
- Developer: AT&T Bell Laboratories
- Initial release: 1977; 49 years ago
- Operating system: Unix and Unix-like
- Type: Command
- License: GNU cpio: GPLv3 libarchive bsdcpio: New BSD License

cpio
- Filename extension: .cpio
- Internet media type: application/x-cpio
- Uniform Type Identifier (UTI): public.cpio-archive
- Type of format: File archiver

cpio is a general file archiver utility and its associated file format. It is primarily installed on Unix-like computer operating systems. The software utility was originally intended as a tape archiving program as part of the Programmer's Workbench (PWB/UNIX), and has been a component of virtually every Unix operating system released thereafter. Its name is derived from the phrase copy in and out, in close description of the program's use of standard input and standard output in its operation.

All variants of Unix also support other backup and archiving programs, such as tar, which has become more widely recognized. The use of cpio by the RPM Package Manager, in the initramfs of the Linux kernel since version 2.6, and in Apple's Installer (pax) make cpio an important archiving tool.

Since its original design, cpio and its archive file format have undergone several, sometimes incompatible, revisions. Most notable is the change, now an operational option, from the use of a binary format of archive file meta information to an ASCII-based representation.

cpio was removed from POSIX.1-2001 in favor of pax, a similar utility which had been introduced in the previous version of the standard.

== History ==
cpio appeared in Version 7 Unix as part of the Programmer's Workbench project.

== Operation and archive format ==
cpio was originally designed to store backup file archives on a tape device in a sequential, contiguous manner. It does not compress any content, but resulting archives are often compressed using gzip or other external compressors.

=== Archive creation ===
When creating archives during the copy-out operation, initiated with the -o command line flag, cpio reads file and directory path names from its standard input channel and writes the resulting archive byte stream to its standard output. Cpio is therefore typically used with other utilities that generate the list of files to be archived, such as the find program.

The resulting cpio archive is a sequence of files and directories concatenated into a single archive, separated by header sections with file meta information, such as filename, inode number, ownership, permissions, and timestamps. By convention, the file name of an archive is usually given the file extension cpio.

This example uses the find utility to generate a list of path names starting in the current directory to create an archive of the directory tree:

$ find . -depth -print | cpio -o > /path/archive.cpio

=== Extraction ===
During the copy-in operation, initiated by the command line flag i, cpio reads an archive from its standard input and recreates the archived files in the operating system's file system.

$ cpio -i -vd < archive.cpio

Command line flag d tells cpio to construct directories as necessary. Flag v (verbose) lists file names as they are extracted.

Any remaining command line arguments other than the option flags are shell-like globbing-patterns; only files in the archive with matching names are copied from the archive. The following example extracts the file /etc/fstab from the archive:

$ cpio -i -d /etc/fstab < archive.cpio

=== List ===
The files contained in a cpio archive may be listed with this invocation:

$ cpio -t < archive.cpio

List may be useful since a cpio archive may contain absolute rather than relative paths (e.g., /bin/ls vs. bin/ls).

=== Copy ===
Cpio supports a third type of operation which copies files. It is initiated with the pass-through option flag (p). This mode combines the copy-out and copy-in steps without actually creating any file archive. In this mode, cpio reads path names on standard input like the copy-out operation, but instead of creating an archive, it recreates the directories and files at a different location in the file system, as specified by the path given as a command line argument.

This example copies the directory tree starting at the current directory to another path new-path in the file system, preserving files modification times (flag m), creating directories as needed (d), replacing any existing files unconditionally (u), while producing a progress listing on standard output (v):

$ find . -depth -print | cpio -p -dumv new-path

== POSIX standardization ==
The cpio utility is standardized in POSIX.1-1988, but was omitted from POSIX.1-2001 because of its file size and other limitations. For example, the GNU version offers various output format options, such as "bin" (default, and obsolete) and "ustar" (POSIX tar), having a file size limitations of 2,147,483,647 bytes (2 GB) and 8,589,934,591 bytes (8 GB), respectively.

The cpio, ustar, and pax file formats are defined by POSIX.1-2001 for the pax utility, which is currently POSIX 1003.1-2008 compliant, and so it can read and write cpio and ustar formatted archives.

== Implementations ==
Most Linux distributions provide the GNU version of cpio. FreeBSD and macOS use the BSD-licensed bsdcpio provided with libarchive.

== See also ==
- List of Unix commands
- List of archive formats
