= Synaptic (software) =

GTK GUI front end for APT package manager

Package Manager

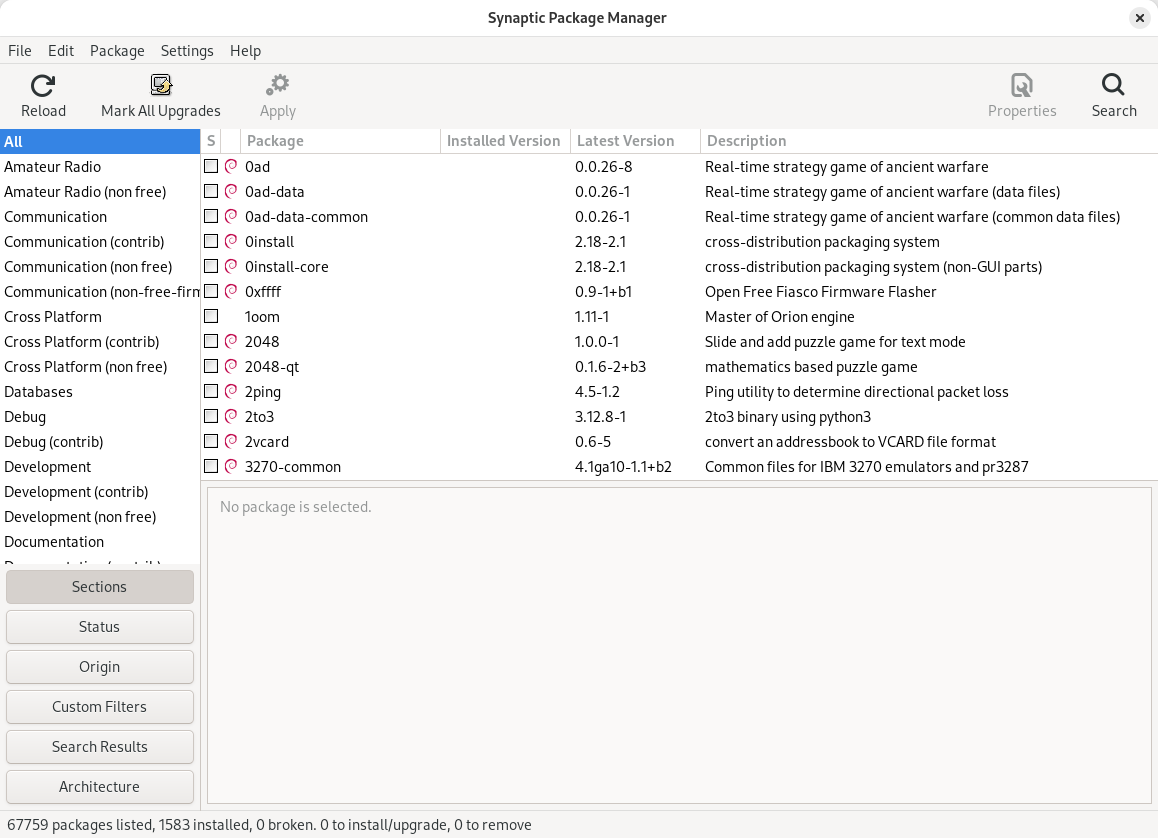
- Screenshot Synaptic on Debian Trixie
- Original authors: Alfredo Kojima, Gustavo Niemeyer and Michael Vogt
- Developer: Canonical Ltd
- Release: November 13, 2001; 25 years ago
- Stable release: 0.92 / October 5, 2026; 41 days ago
- Written in: C, C++, Python
- Operating system: Debian and derivatives
- Available in: English
- Type: Package manager
- License: GNU GPLv2
- Website: github.com/mvo5/synaptic/wiki
- Repository: github.com/mvo5/synaptic

Synaptic is a GTK-based graphical user interface designed for the APT package manager used by the Debian Linux distribution and its derivatives. Synaptic is usually used on systems based on deb packages but can also be used on systems based on RPM packages. It can be used to install, remove and upgrade software packages and to add repositories.

== Usage ==
Synaptic is a lightweight package manager that enables the user to install, upgrade or remove software packages. To install or remove a package a user must search or navigate to the package, then mark it for installation or removal. Changes are not applied instantly; the user must first mark all changes and then apply them.

== History ==
Synaptic development was funded by the Brazilian company Conectiva, which asked Alfredo Kojima, then an employee, to write a graphical front-end for APT, continuing the work initiated with the creation of the APT RPM back-end, apt-rpm.

== See also ==
- Aptitude (software), an ncurses interface for APT
- GNOME Software
- PackageKit
