= GNewSense =

Linux distribution

gNewSense

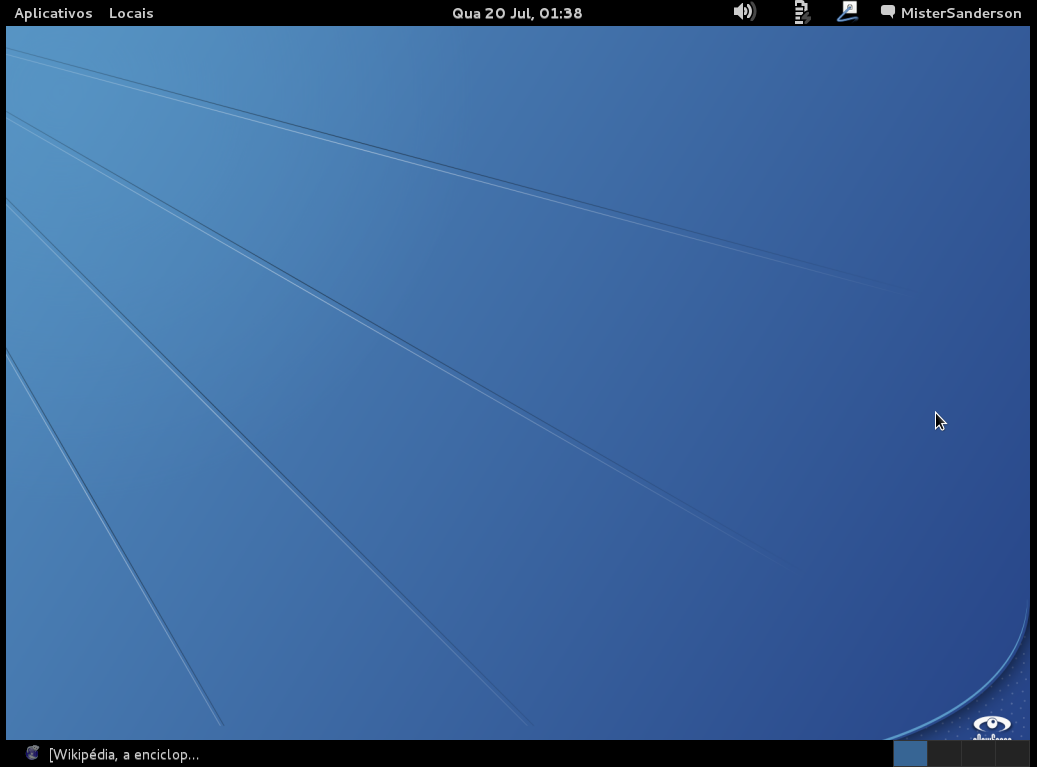
- gNewSense 4.0
- Developer: Current: Matt Lee former: Sam Geeraerts, K.Goetz, Brian Brazil and Paul O'Malley
- OS family: Linux (Unix-like)
- Working state: discontinued
- Initial release: November 2, 2006; 19 years ago
- Latest release: 4.0 / 2 May 2016; 10 years ago
- Latest preview: 4.0 Alpha 1 / 2 December 2014; 11 years ago
- Repository: bzr.savannah.gnu.org/r/gnewsense/
- Update method: long term support
- Package manager: apt (standard), Synaptic (Gtk+ frontend), dpkg (low-level system)
- Supported platforms: amd64, i386, Loongson
- Kernel type: Monolithic (Linux)
- Userland: GNU
- Default user interface: GNOME
- License: FSDG
- Official website: www.gnewsense.org (Currently Not Running)

gNewSense is a Linux distribution that was actively developed from 2006 to 2016. It is based on Debian, and development was initially sponsored by the Free Software Foundation. It was created with the goal of providing user-friendliness while excluding any proprietary (e.g. binary blobs) and other non-free software. The Free Software Foundation considered gNewSense to be composed entirely of free software.

The gNewSense project took a relatively strict stance against proprietary software. For example, any documentation that gave instructions on installing proprietary software was similarly excluded.

gNewSense's last release in 2016 fell out of support in 2018. DistroWatch classifies gNewSense as "discontinued".

== History ==
The project was launched by Brian Brazil and Paul O'Malley in 2006. gNewSense was originally based on Ubuntu. With the 1.0 release, the Free Software Foundation provided assistance to gNewSense.

With no releases in two years, on 8 August 2011, DistroWatch classified gNewSense as "dormant". By September 2012 DistroWatch had changed the status to "active" again, and on 6 August 2013, the first version directly based on Debian, gNewSense 3 "Parkes", was released.

There have been several indications that it may be restarted, including a website announcement in 2019, but the project has remained inactive, with no releases since 2016. DistroWatch returned it to "dormant" status again in 2019 and "discontinued" by 2022.

As of 13 April 2021, the home page of the project's website displayed a blank page with a meme labelling the Free Software Foundation a cult. After a short time, the website then redirected to the home page of the PureOS website.

However, as of June 2021, it now redirects to the FSF's list of Free/Libre distros.

== Technical aspects ==
gNewSense logo, used from 2007 to 2013

By default gNewSense uses GNOME. The graphical user interface can be customized with the user's choice of X display manager, window managers, and other desktop environments available to install through its hosted repositories.

The Ubiquity installer allows installing to the hard disk from within the Live CD environment without the need for restarting the computer prior to installation.

Besides standard system tools and other small applications, gNewSense includes the following software: the LibreOffice productivity suite, GNOME Web, the Empathy instant messenger, and the GIMP for editing photos and other raster graphics. Common software development tools including the GCC are installed by default.

=== Installation ===
The Live CD can be used to run the operating system and to install onto disk. CD images are available for download.

=== Versions ===
gNewSense has made four major releases:

Version	Code name	Release date	Supported until	Based on	Supported architectures
1.0	DeltaD	2006-11-02	2008-05-01	Ubuntu 6.06 "Dapper Drake"	—N/a
2.0	DeltaH	2008-04-30	2014-01-03	Ubuntu 8.04 "Hardy Heron"	—N/a
3.0	Parkes	2013-08-06	2015-12-31	Debian 6.0 "Squeeze"	i386, amd64, Lemote Yeeloong
4.0	Ucclia	2016-05-02	2018-05-31	Debian 7 "Wheezy"	i386, amd64, Lemote Yeeloong

In 2016, gNewSense announced that the next version of gNewSense would be 5.0.

== Comparison with other distributions ==
Non-free software repositories are not provided by the gNewSense project, and most non-free documentation and artwork have been removed. While it was based on Ubuntu, the "Universe" package repository was enabled by default. In order to avoid trademark problems that stem from the modification of Mozilla Firefox, gNewSense 1.1 rebranded it as "BurningDog". BurningDog likewise does not offer to install non-free plugins for various web media, such as Adobe Flash. gNewSense 2.0 abandoned BurningDog and adopted the Epiphany web browser (later renamed simply "Web"), a component of GNOME, as its default browser application, and came with recommendations and instructions to optionally compile and run GNU IceCat. gNewSense 3.0 retains Web as the default browser, but also comes with a modified version of Debian's Iceweasel that does not offer to access proprietary add-ons.

Debian is another Linux distribution known for strict licensing requirements and adherence to free software principles. While both Debian and gNewSense rigorously exclude non-free software and binary blobs from their official releases, Debian maintains and hosts unofficial repositories of non-free software and firmware binaries, and Debian free software sometimes depends upon or suggests the optional installation of proprietary software, under the theory that users' own informed discretion about the use of such software should be paramount, as expressed in Clause 5 of the Debian Social Contract (though Debian's democratic project management has seen this stance become a source of recurrent controversy). gNewSense, by contrast, does not provide any packages which depend on or suggest the use of non-free software, firmware, extensions, or plugins, nor does the gNewSense Project provide convenience-access to proprietary software for any reason, seeing this as an abrogation of the commitment to the development of free software solutions. Similar to Debian, gNewSense policies do not allow including documentation that are licensed under the GNU Free Documentation License with invariant sections. This includes many manuals and documentation released by the GNU Project themselves.

While gNewSense was initially forked from Ubuntu (itself originally a fork of Debian) as a result of founding developer Paul O'Malley's prior work with Ubuntu, as of gNewSense 3.0 the distribution has tracked Debian as the base for its software distribution. In part this has been because the Debian Project does carefully disaggregate the free software in its official distribution from the proprietary software it provides courtesy access to. Indeed, many of the packages, including Debian-particular packages (such as Iceweasel and Icedove) ported to gNewSense are simply modified in such a way that they no longer provide such courtesy access to non-free software options.

== Limitations ==
Since gNewSense's repositories contain only free software, support for hardware which requires firmware and for which no free firmware exists (such as some wireless network cards) is not available.

By 1 May 2008, 3D graphics and application support had also been removed because of licensing issues with Mesa 3D. After January 13, 2009, those issues had been resolved and 3D support became standard starting with the 2.2 release.

== Reception ==
In reviewing gNewSense 3.0 in August 2013, Jesse Smith of DistroWatch noted that many of the applications provided, including OpenOffice.org 3, Debian's de-blobbed 2.6.32 Linux kernel (based on Linux-libre tools), Iceweasel 3.5 and GNOME 2.30 were quite out of date. Smith concluded this review with the following words:

Generally speaking, I was happy with gNewSense 3.0. Being based on Debian, the distribution can be counted on to provide both stability and amazing performance. The distribution is lean, fast and uncluttered. The flip side to this is gNewSense's system installer and default package management tools are geared more toward experienced users and will probably provide a steep learning curve to novice Linux users. Not much is automated and there is a minimum of hand holding. The main feature of gNewSense, the lack of proprietary software, is also a double-edged blade. On the one hand, it means the entire operating system can be audited, modified and redistributed. This is great from the perspective of software freedom. The fact that the distribution can play most multimedia formats and handled Flash content fairly well is a testament of the power of free and open source software. The one problem I ran into with gNewSense's software policy was with regards to my wireless network card. Most distributions ship with the non-free Intel firmware, but gNewSense doesn't include it and this means the distribution isn't a good fit with my laptop. It is, on the other hand, a great match with my desktop system.

Richard Stallman, founder and former president of the Free Software Foundation, said he used gNewSense on a Lemote Yeeloong laptop in January 2010 and he was still using it in April 2014. Since then Stallman has switched to Trisquel.

Serdar Yegulalp reviewed gNewSense for InfoWorld. He is said:

The base of gNewSense is the Debian distribution, which already excludes proprietary binary blobs and unfree software but provides access to them via repositories. But gNewSense goes further: It doesn't even include access to such software in its repositories. Its documentation also includes only material that's compatible with the GNU Free Documentation License.

In the post on Network World of gNewSense 3.1 in February 2014, Bryan Lunduke reviewed this Linux distribution with following words:

In fact, the stock installation of gNewSense – thanks, in large part, to using older and lighter versions of popular software – is incredibly fast and astoundingly un-taxing on your hardware. The whole system, when logged in with no additional software running, uses roughly 105MB of RAM. So this plucky little distro will perform well on even modest hardware.

== See also ==
- Comparison of Linux distributions
- List of distributions based on Debian
- GNU/Linux naming controversy
