= Hyperbola GNU/Linux-libre =

Linux distribution

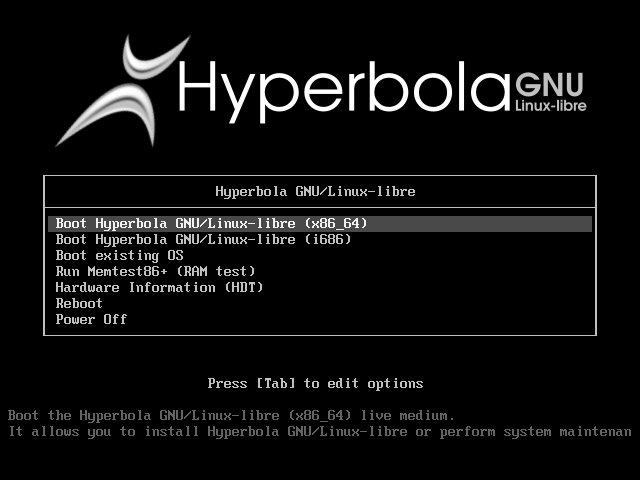
- Hyperbola GNU/Linux-libre live boot selection mode
- Developer: Hyperbola Founders
- OS family: Unix-like (Linux kernel)
- Working state: Current
- Source model: Free software
- Initial release: April 15, 2017; 9 years ago
- Latest release: 0.4.4 / 5 January 2024; 2 years ago
- Repository: git.hyperbola.info:50100
- Update method: Long-term support
- Package manager: pacman
- Supported platforms: AMD64, i686
- Kernel type: Monolithic (Linux-libre)
- Userland: GNU
- Default user interface: Bash
- License: Free software (GNU GPL and other licenses)
- Official website: www.hyperbola.info

Hyperbola GNU/Linux-libre is a Linux distribution for the i686 and x86-64 architectures, including the GNU operating system components and the Linux-libre kernel instead of the generic Linux kernel. Free Software Foundation considers it a completely free operating system, true to its Free System Distribution Guidelines. Hyperbola GNU/Linux-libre uses pacman as the package manager and some patchsets from the Debian development though stopping using patchsets from Debian beyond the version Debian 12.

The project has been developing a fork of OpenBSD called HyperbolaBSD since 2019. They stated the goal of developing an independent, GPL-compatible operating system that excludes binary blobs, with the plan to eventually discontinue the Linux distribution, citing concerns with the Linux kernel regarding code security, support for digital rights management, and use of Rust.

== History ==
Hyperbola was born at the 17th annual Fórum Internacional Software Livre (Porto Alegre, Brazil).

On 5 August 2017, support for systemd was dropped in favor of OpenRC as its default init system to support the Init Freedom Campaign begun by Devuan.

On 6 December 2018, Hyperbola was the first Brazilian distribution recognized as a completely free project by GNU, making it part of the FSF list of free distributions.

On 23 September 2019, Hyperbola announced its first release with the implementation of Xenocara as its default display server for the X Window System and LibreSSL as its default system cryptography library.

In December 2019, Hyperbola announced that it would cease to be a Linux distribution, and that it would become a hard fork of OpenBSD called HyperbolaBSD. The stated goal of this fork is to become an independent BSD-derived operating system, remove any non-free binary blobs and make all code GPL-compatible in order to add GPL-licensed code. The project intends to contact the authors of many of the 4-clause BSD-licensed source code files to ask them to remove the controversial BSD advertising clause, which is incompatible with the GPL.

The project cited objections to recent developments in the Linux kernel that they deemed to be an "unstable path", including inclusion of optional support for High-bandwidth Digital Content Protection, the kernel "being written without security in mind", GNU and "core" components with non-optional dependencies, and endorsement of the Rust programming language (which the project prohibits due to issues with the project's trademark policies and third-party dependencies).

Since the release of version 0.4 on 1 March 2022, Hyperbola rebased towards its own packages built from scratch and is no longer using any marked snapshot from Arch Linux.

== Social contract ==
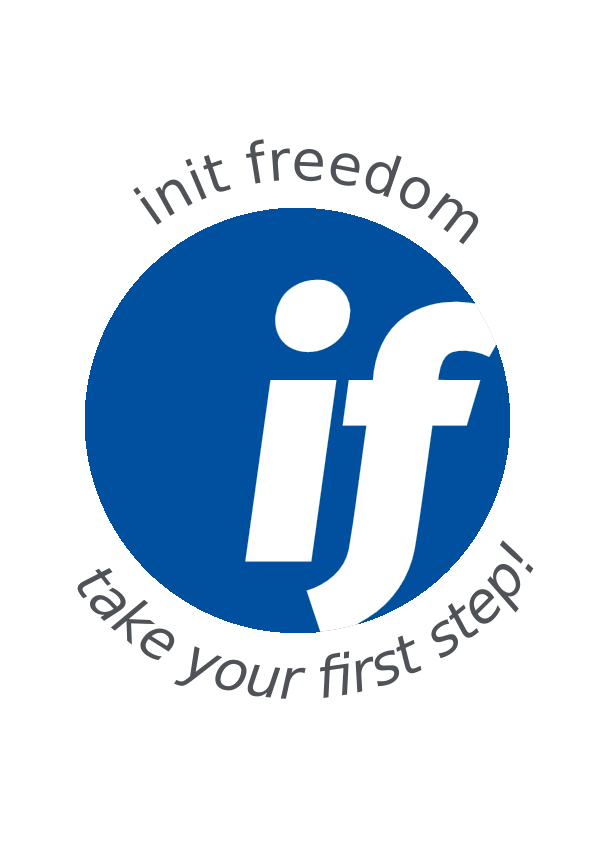
Logo Init Freedom campaign of Devuan

The Hyperbola social contract incorporates aspects of the Parabola GNU/Linux-libre social contract and the Init Freedom movement of Devuan. It commits the project to following the principles of the free software movement and free culture (including only supporting community-driven projects), respecting the privacy of users, and respecting the principles of stability (rejecting software that is "broken by design") and a minimal system that is lightweight and modular (including rejecting undue abstraction layers such as D-Bus and systemd).

== Development ==
=== Packaging guidelines ===
Hyperbola requires all software to adhere to the GNU Free System Distribution Guidelines and the Hyperbola social contract. Even if a project is free and open source software, the Hyperbola project excludes all packages that are deemed to violate its social contract, and any package that has non-optional dependencies on excluded packages, including those that:

- Are not a community-driven project; this prohibits all software developed by for-profit corporations, as they are viewed as leveraging corporate influence to coerce adoption of a product or standard, and are not truly supporting the free software movement (thus violating the principle of "technical emancipation").
- Are proprietary software, or contain binary blobs and/or obfuscated code.
- Have dependencies on Linux functions that prevent it from being ported to BSD
- Have trademark policies that hinder the ability to package modified versions as part of the project.
- Add technical, "social", or "economical" bloat to the Hyperbola project (including excessive dependencies, disrespect of user choice, ignoring backwards compatibility, or replacing an existing and/or established alternative), and thus violate the principle of "technical emancipation".
- Have "vulnerable and insecure implementations" and do not commit to the principle of long-term support
- Are "clearly non-free" in their outcome.
- Are designed to support non-free software, formats, or network services.

Under these guidelines, the Hyperbola project rejects packages such as D-Bus, PulseAudio, and systemd (bloat), Rust (corporate-backed project, official implementation is subject to a "vague" trademark policy, depends on a package manager capable of downloading non-free dependencies), Vulkan (only useful for modern GPUs thus breaking backwards compatibility), Zstd (corporate project), Wayland (non-portable, technical bloat, replaces existing product X11), and Mozilla Firefox (bloat, trademark policy, and encourages use of non-free services; the project maintained a fork of Basilisk known as Iceweasel-UXP, but it was discontinued due to a lack of maintainers). Packages may be held back by the project if it is determined that current releases violate the social contract.

=== Codenames ===
Hyperbola aliases its stable releases using galaxy names as codenames chosen from the list of nearest known galaxies of the Milky Way, in ascending order of distance.

=== Release cycle ===
A stable version of Hyperbola gets released approximately every three years. Point releases will be available every few months. For each Hyperbola release, it will receive two years of extra security updates after its End Of Life (EOL). However, no further point releases will be made. Each Hyperbola release will receive five years of security support in total.

== Installation ==
Hyperbola GNU/Linux-libre can be installed from scratch using the live images. Prior to the version 0.4, migrating from an existing Arch-based system was supported.

== See also ==
- Comparison of Linux distributions
- GNU/Linux naming controversy
- GNU variants
- List of distributions based on Arch
- List of Pacman-based distributions
