= Parabola GNU/Linux-libre =

Linux distribution based on Arch Linux offering only free software

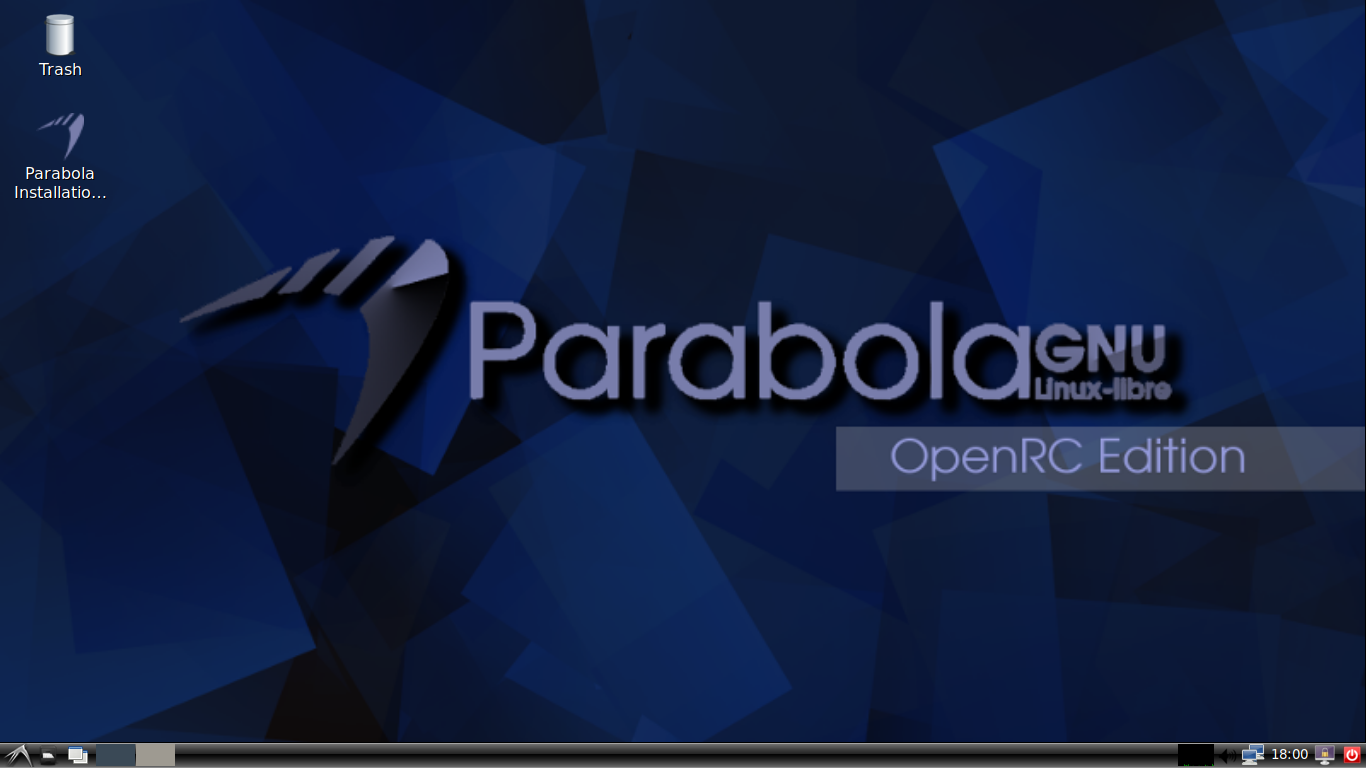
- Parabola GNU/Linux-libre Desktop with LXDE.
- Developer: Parabola Hackers
- OS family: Unix-like (Linux-libre)
- Working state: Current
- Source model: Free software
- Initial release: October 26, 2009; 16 years ago
- Latest release: (Rolling release) / Installation medium parabola-x86_64-experimental-lxde-2019.06-pre-complete parabola-armv7h-systemd-cli-2020.02-image parabola-x86_64-systemd-cli-2022.04-netinstall parabola-i686-systemd-cli-2024.02
- Repository: repo.parabola.nu/sources/
- Update method: Rolling release
- Package manager: pacman
- Supported platforms: x86-64, AMD64, i686, ARMv7
- Kernel type: Monolithic (Linux-libre)
- Userland: GNU
- Default user interface: Zsh CLI (Main live and TalkingParabola ISO); MATE (MATE live ISO); LXDE (LXDE live ISO)
- License: FSDG
- Official website: www.parabola.nu

Parabola GNU/Linux-libre is a free and open-source Linux distribution based on Arch Linux and Arch Linux ARM for the x86-64, i686, and ARMv7 architectures. It is distinguished from other Arch-based distributions by offering only free software. It includes the GNU operating system components common to many Linux distributions and the Linux-libre kernel instead of the generic Linux kernel. Parabola is listed by the Free Software Foundation as a completely free operating system, true to their Free System Distribution Guidelines.

Parabola uses a rolling release model like Arch, such that a regular system update is all that is needed to obtain the latest software. Development focuses on system simplicity, community involvement, and use of the latest free software packages.

== History ==
Parabola was originally proposed by members of the gNewSense IRC channel in 2009. Members of different Arch Linux communities, especially Spanish-speaking members, started the development and maintenance of the project's software and documentation.

On 20 May 2011, the Parabola distribution was recognized as a completely free project by GNU, making it part of the FSF list of free distributions.

In February 2012 Dmitrij D. Czarkoff reviewed Parabola for OSNews. Czarkoff reported that on his test computer a number of hardware problems surfaced, due to lack of free firmware. He said

That effectively means that many devices are not supported in Parabola. Eg., after installing it on my Acer Aspire One 531h netbook I couldn't use my Broadcom bluetooth module and Intel's WiFi/WiMax Link 5150 adapter. (I still could use my HTC Magic with a custom Gingerbread ROM as a USB 3G/WiFi modem, though having something always connected to USB port is pretty annoying on laptop and specifically on netbook.)

— Dmitrij D. Czarkoff

Czarkoff also criticized the lack of documentation available for Parabola. He concluded "The overall impression of the Parabola GNU/Linux user experience exactly matches the one of Arch: a system with easy and flexible installation and configuration process and good choice of free software packages. Though the lack of documentation spoils the user experience, the Arch Linux resources can be used to further configure and extend the distribution. If my hardware would allow, I would probably stick with Parabola."

Parabola used to have a mips64el port to provide support for the Chinese Loongson processor used in the Lemote Yeeloong laptop. It was discontinued due to a lack of resources and interest, and the final activity was seen in July 2014.

Robert Rijkhoff reviewed Parabola GNU/Linux for DistroWatch in September 2017.

== Differences from Arch and Arch ARM ==
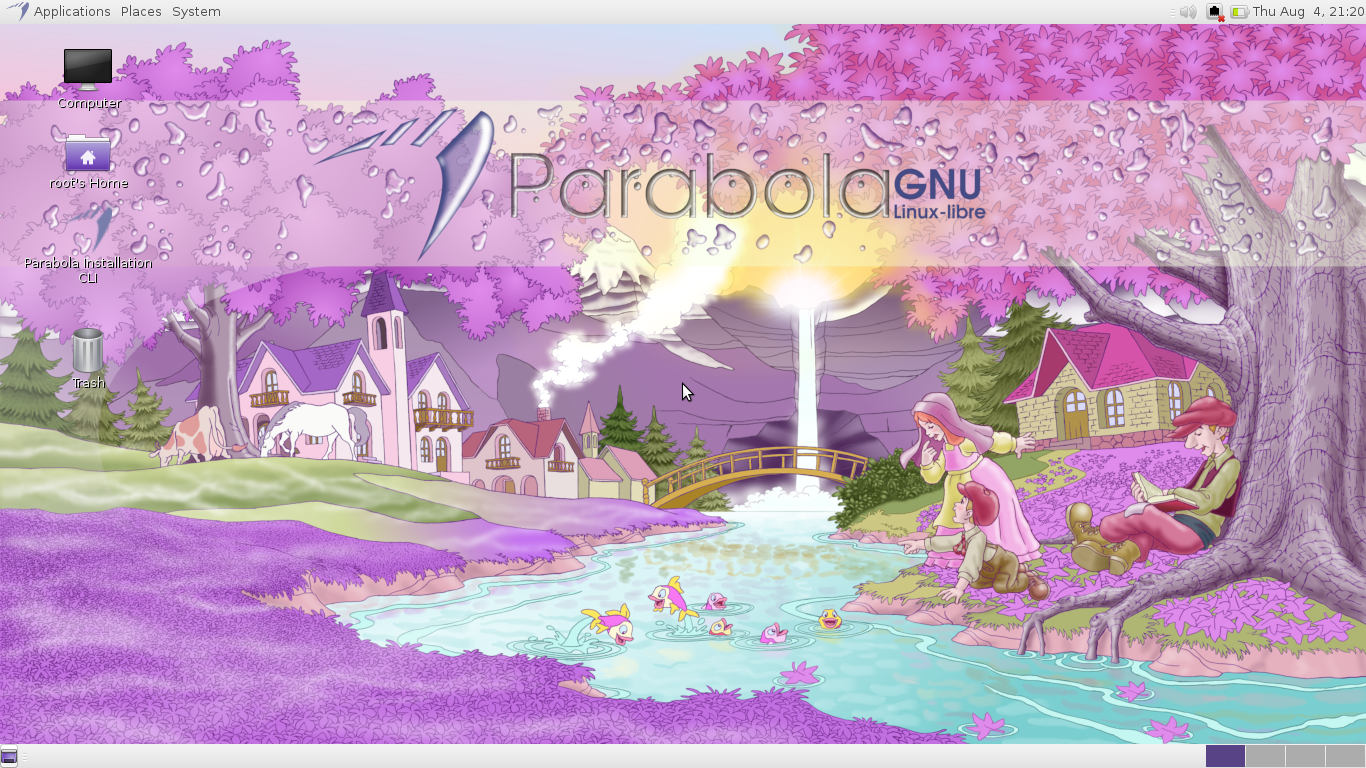
Parabola GNU/Linux-libre running the MATE desktop environment

The project uses only exclusively free software from the official Arch repositories for the i686 and x86-64 architectures and official Arch ARM repositories (except alarm and the AUR) for the ARMv7. It uses free replacements when possible, such as the Linux-libre kernel instead of the generic Linux kernel.

The filtering process removes around 700 software packages from the repositories that do not meet the requirements of the Free Software Definition for each architecture.

=== Social contract ===
Parabola has established a social contract. The Parabola Social Contract commits the project to the free software community (viewing itself as only competing against non-free systems), free culture, democracy, and to follow Arch's philosophy. Under the covenant are included the GNU Free System Distribution Guidelines.

=== Installation ===
There are two ways to install Parabola, either from scratch using installable ISO images, or by migrating from an existing Arch-based system. The latter process is almost as simple as switching to the Parabola repositories list.

=== TalkingParabola ===
TalkingParabola is a derivative install CD based on TalkingArch. It is a respin of the Parabola ISO modified to include speech and braille output for blind and visually impaired users. TalkingParabola retains all the features of the Parabola live image, but adds speech and braille packages to make it possible for blind and visually impaired users to install Parabola eyes-free.

== Mascots ==
The Parabola community has created a number of cartoon characters for the project. The characters are a gnu and a cat named "Bola", who is conceived after Parabola's main characteristics: "elegant, minimalist and lightweight".

== See also ==
- GNU/Linux naming controversy
- GNU variants
- List of Arch-based Linux distributions
- Hyperbola GNU/Linux-libre
