= Harmony (toolkit) =

Free software widget toolkit

The Harmony toolkit is a free software widget toolkit that aimed to be API compatible with the then non-GPL licensed Qt widget toolkit. The QPL license that Qt used was free only if the program was not sold for profit and if its source code was freely available. It was later released under the terms of the GNU Lesser General Public License (LGPL).

In addition to source compatibility with Qt, the Harmony project also aimed to add functionality such as multi-threaded applications and pluggable themes, features that Qt itself later added.

The GNU Project launched the Harmony project, and also the GNOME desktop project, to counter the perceived problem that the free software KDE desktop was gaining popularity but was requiring that people install non GPL licensed software. In July 1997 the GNU Project called for volunteers for a Qt replacement in GNU's Bulletin and listed it as a top priority task on its website.

Development ceased at the end of 2000, when Qt was released under the GPL, removing the perceived need for the Harmony Project to exist. In January 2009 Qt itself was made available under the GNU LGPL, along with the previous license options.
