= Trisquel =

Linux distribution based on Ubuntu

Trisquel GNU/Linux

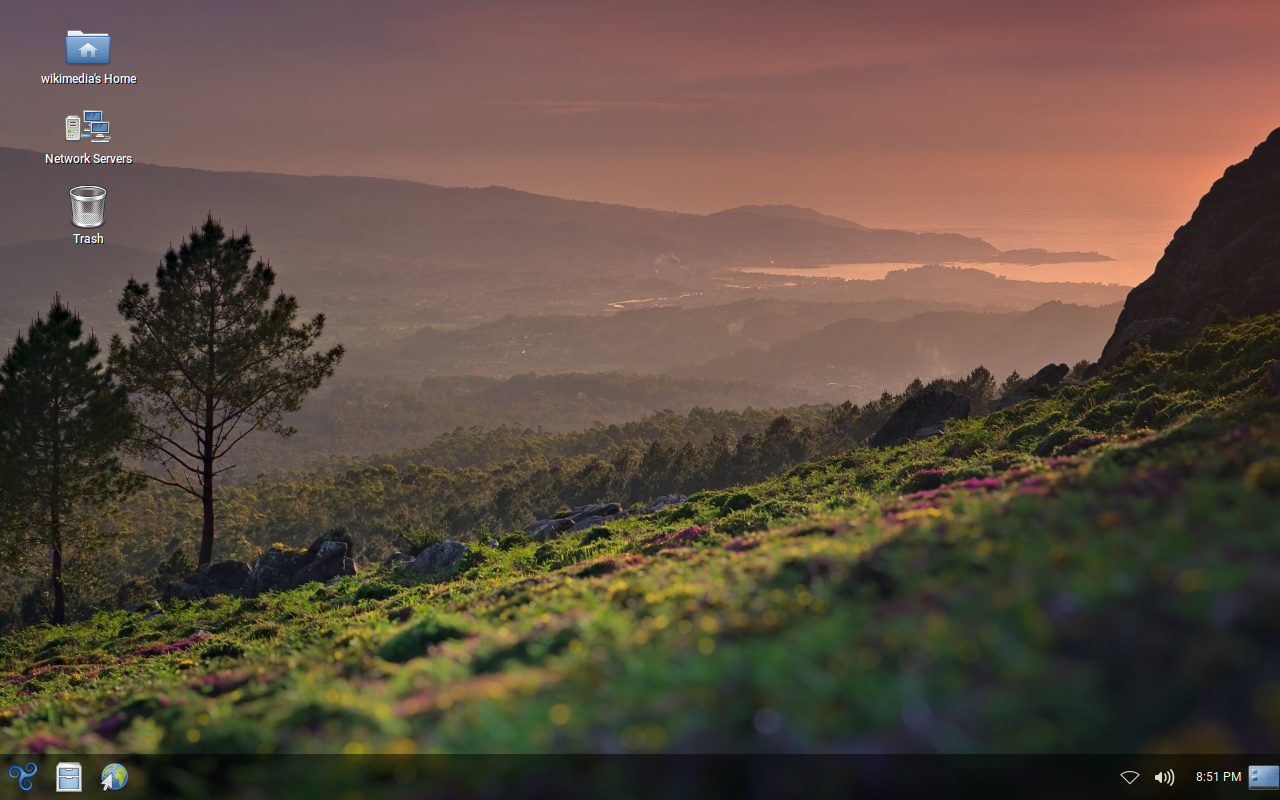
- Trisquel 12.0 desktop
- Developer: The Trisquel Project and Sognus, S.L.U.
- OS family: Unix-like (Linux)
- Working state: Current
- Source model: Free software
- Initial release: January 30, 2007; 19 years ago
- Latest release: 12.0 / April 11, 2026; 7 months ago
- Repository: gitlab.trisquel.org/trisquel/
- Marketing target: Home users, small enterprises, education
- Update method: Long-term support
- Package manager: APT, Synaptic (GTK+ frontend), dpkg
- Supported platforms: x86-64, ARM, POWER9, RISC-V
- Kernel type: Monolithic (Linux-libre)
- Userland: GNU
- Default user interface: LXDE, MATE and KDE (9.0 or above); MATE and LXDE (Flidas, 8.0); GNOME and LXDE (7.0 or below)
- Official website: trisquel.info

Trisquel (full name Trisquel GNU/Linux) is a computer operating system, a Linux distribution, derived from another distribution, Ubuntu. The project aims for a fully free software system without proprietary software or firmware and uses a version of Ubuntu's modified kernel, with the non-free code (binary blobs) removed. Trisquel relies on user donations, as a non-profit group. Its logo is a triskelion, a Celtic symbol. Trisquel is listed by the Free Software Foundation as a distribution that contains only free software.

== Overview ==
Four basic versions are available.

=== Trisquel ===
The standard Trisquel 12 distribution includes the MATE desktop environment and graphical user interface (GUI), and English, Spanish and 48 other localizations, 50 in total, on a 3.4 GB live DVD image. Other translations can be downloaded if an internet connection is present during installation.

It also has a torrent file to download version 12 of it, as well as other versions.

=== Trisquel Mini ===
Trisquel Mini is an alternative to mainline Trisquel, designed to run well on netbooks and older hardware. It uses the low-resource environment LXDE and lightweight GTK+ and X Window System alternatives to GNOME and Qt-KDE applications. The LXDE desktop only includes English and Spanish localizations, and can install from a 1.9 GB live DVD image.

=== Triskel ===
Triskel is another alternative to mainline Trisquel using the KDE Plasma 5 graphical interface, available as a 2.7 GB ISO DVD live image.

=== Trisquel Sugar TOAST ===
Sugar is a free and open source desktop environment designed with the goal of being used by children for interactive learning. Sugar replaces the standard MATE desktop environment available with Trisquel.

=== Trisquel NetInstall ===
NetInstall consists of a 79MB CD iso image with just the minimal amount of software to start the installation via a text based network installer and fetch the remaining packages over the Internet.

== Internationalization ==
The full installation includes 51 languages (Albanian, Arabic, Aranese, Asturian, Basque, Bulgarian, Catalan, Central Khmer, Simplified Chinese, Traditional Chinese, Croatian, Czech, Danish, Dutch, English, Esperanto, Estonian, Finnish, French, Galician, German, Greek, Hebrew, Hindi, Hungarian, Indonesian, Irish, Italian, Japanese, Korean, Latvian, Lithuanian, Low German, Norwegian Bokmål, Norwegian Nynorsk, Occitan, Punjabi, Polish, Portuguese, Romanian, Russian, Serbian, Slovak, Slovenian, Spanish, Swedish, Tamil, Thai, Turkish, Valencian and Vietnamese) pre-installed in a downloadable 3.4-gigabyte DVD image.

== Source code ==
Source code for the full Trisquel 12 installation is also available in a downloadable of about 9-gigabyte tar file.

The source code can also be obtained with a torrent file.

== History ==
The project began in 2004 with sponsorship of the University of Vigo for Galician language support in education software and was officially presented in April 2005 with Richard Stallman, founder of the GNU Project, as a special guest. According to project director Rubén Rodríguez, the support for Galician has created interest in South American and Mexican communities of emigrants from the Province of Ourense.

By December 2008, the Free Software Foundation (FSF) had added Trisquel to its list of FSF-endorsed GNU/Linux distributions.

== Release history ==
Legend:
Unsupported
Supported
Latest version
Future version

Version	Code name	Release date	Supported until	Kernel	Desktop environment default	Based on
1.0	Arianrhod	2007-01-30	—N/a	Linux 2.6.18.6	GNOME 2.14	Debian 4.0 (Etch)
2.0 LTS	Robur	2008-07-24	2014-03-02	Linux 2.6.24	GNOME 2.22	Ubuntu 8.04 LTS (Hardy Heron)
3.0 STS	Dwyn	2009-09-08	2011-05-11	Linux-libre 2.6.28	GNOME 2.26	Ubuntu 9.04 (Jaunty Jackalope)
3.5 STS	Awen	2010-03-22	2011-07-14	Linux-libre 2.6.31	GNOME 2.28	Ubuntu 9.10 (Karmic Koala)
4.0 LTS	Taranis	2010-09-18	2015	Linux-libre 2.6.32	GNOME 2.30	Ubuntu 10.04 LTS (Lucid Lynx)
4.5 STS	Slaine	2011-03-24	2012-09-15	Linux-libre 2.6.35	GNOME 2.32	Ubuntu 10.10 (Maverick Meerkat)
5.0 STS	Dagda	2011-09-17	2014-03-02	Linux-libre 2.6.38	GNOME 2.32	Ubuntu 11.04 (Natty Narwhal)
5.5 STS	Brigantia	2012-04-16	2014-03-02	Linux-libre 3.0	GNOME 3.2	Ubuntu 11.10 (Oneiric Ocelot)
6.0 LTS	Toutatis	2013-03-09	2017	Linux-libre 3.2	GNOME 3.4	Ubuntu 12.04 LTS (Precise Pangolin)
7.0 LTS	Belenos	2014-11-03	2019	Linux-libre 3.13	GNOME 3.12	Ubuntu 14.04 LTS (Trusty Tahr)
8.0 LTS	Flidas	2018-04-18	2021	Linux-libre 4.4	MATE 1.12	Ubuntu 16.04 LTS (Xenial Xerus)
9.0 LTS	Etiona	2020-10-16	2023-04	Linux-libre 4.15	MATE 1.20	Ubuntu 18.04 LTS (Bionic Beaver)
10.0 LTS	Nabia	2022-02-01	2025-05	Linux-libre 5.4	MATE 1.24	Ubuntu 20.04 LTS (Focal Fossa)
11.0 LTS	Aramo	2023-03-19	2027-06-01	Linux-libre 5.15	MATE 1.26	Ubuntu 22.04 LTS (Jammy Jellyfish)
12.0 LTS	Ecne	2026-04-11	2029-05-31	Linux-libre 6.8	MATE 1.26.2	Ubuntu 24.04 LTS (Noble Numbat)
13.0 LTS	Xolotl	TBA	2031-05-29	Linux-libre 7.0	MATE 1.28.2	Ubuntu 26.04 LTS (Resolute Raccoon)

The releases that use GNOME 3.x use GNOME Flashback, rather than the default GNOME Shell. Starting with version 6, Trisquel is based on the LTS Version of Ubuntu.

The current version includes this common software pre-installed:

Category	Type	Name	Notes
Internet	Web browser	Abrowser	Rebranded Firefox.* Never suggests non-free add-ons. No trademarked art or names. Privacy enhancing mods^{†}
Internet	Email, PIM	IceDove	Rebranded Thunderbird. Never suggests non-free add-ons. No trademarked art or names.
Internet	Instant messenger	Pidgin	End-to-end encrypted, multi-protocol incl. IRC, XMPP
Internet	Cryptocurrency wallet	Electrum	for Bitcoin, Lightning Network
Internet	Videoconferencing	Jami	Also VOIP
Internet	News aggregator	Liferea	News feeds & podcasts via RSS/RDF & Atom
Office	Word processor	LibreOffice Writer	Also desktop publishing
Office	Spreadsheet	LibreOffice Calc	
Office	Presentation	LibreOffice Impress	
Office	Vector graphics editor	LibreOffice Draw	
Graphics	Raster graphics editor	GIMP	
Sound & Video	Disc-burning	Brasero	
Sound & Video	Webcam	Cheese	
Sound & Video	Music / audio player	Rhythmbox	Rips CDs, syncs w/ digital music players, etc
Sound & Video	Video player	VLC	Plays QuickTime, DVD, Blu-ray, etc. Also plays audio formats.

*Rebranded because the Mozilla Trademark Policy forbids modifications that include their trademark without consent.
†Such as never starting network connections on its own.

Also includes pre-installed software for remote desktop operations, photo/image viewing, document and photo input via scanner, games (such as solitaire, Minesweeper, chess, Mahjongg, and Sudoku), and for adding and removing more software (both Synaptic and a more simplified front-end called "Add/Remove Applications" offering a curated list of the most popular apps), etc.

Prior editions:

- Gnash, a SWF viewer, instead of Adobe Flash Player, which is proprietary software.

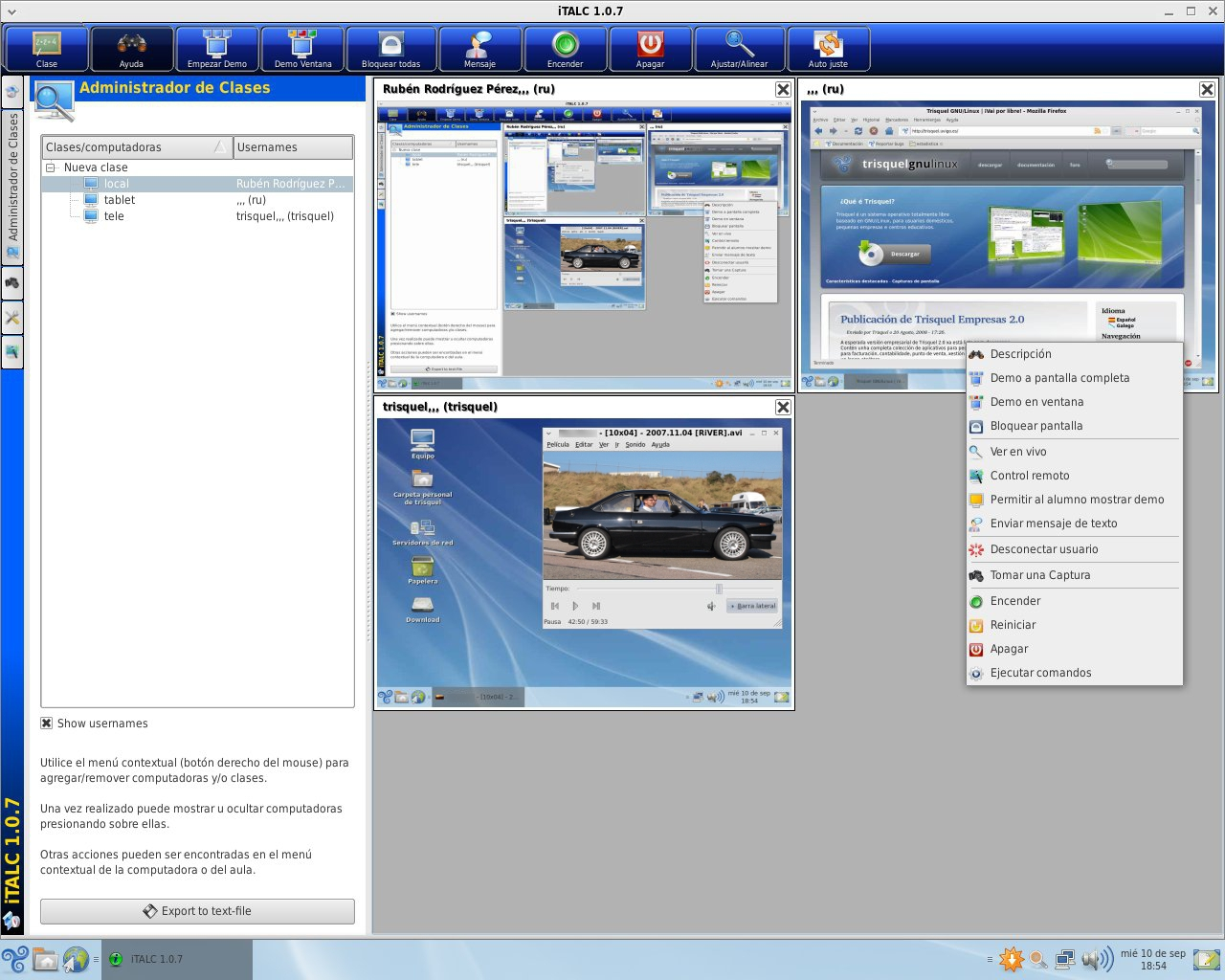
Trisquel LTSP classroom server, managed via iTALC.

- Trisquel Pro was business-oriented and small. It was part of the Trisquel 2.0 LTS Robur (2008), but no other release followed.
- Trisquel Edu was education-oriented, for schools and universities. Like Trisquel Pro, no other release followed Trisquel 2.0 Robur (2008).
- Trisquel on Sugar was education-oriented, based on the Sugar desktop environment for interactive learning for children. It was released at the same time as Trisquel 7.
- Trisquel Gamer was an independent edition maintained by David Zaragoza. It included 55 free software games and could boot from a live DVD or USB drive. It was released with Trisquel 3.5 (2010), which is no longer supported.

== Reception ==
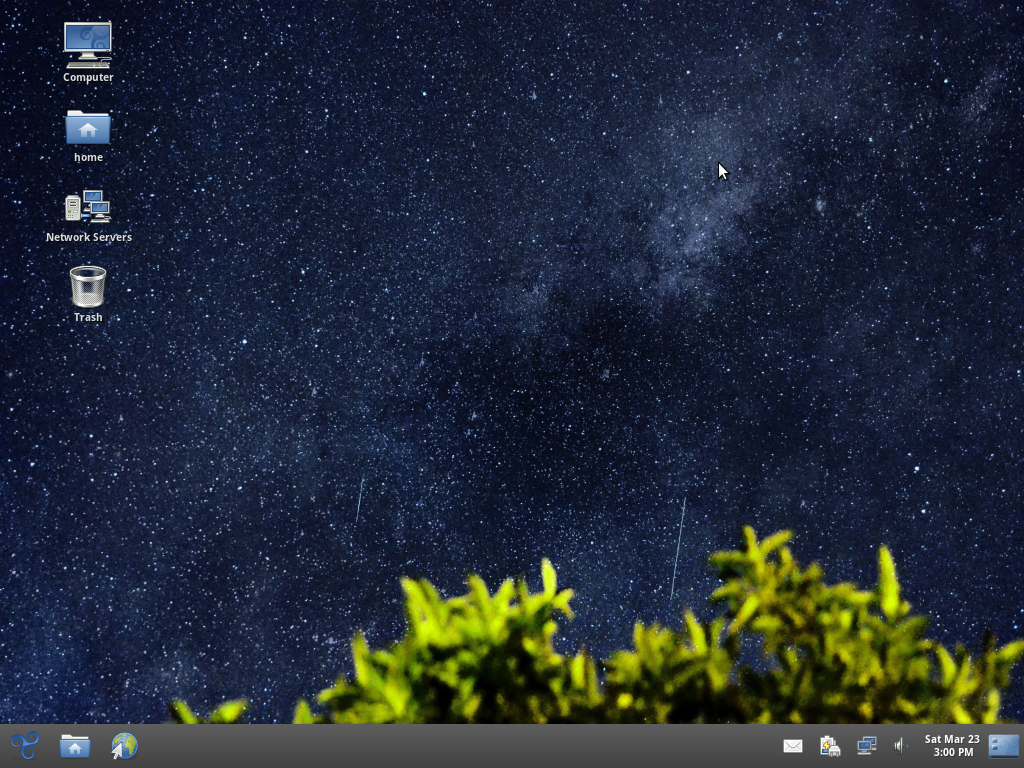
Trisquel 6 Desktop running GNOME Fallback Mode

Jesse Smith of DistroWatch reviewed the 4.0 release, Taranis, and described it as refined and dependable. He portrayed difficulty with removing software as his main problem with the release. He complimented it as an operating system that showcased utility instead of mere compliance with free software criteria.

Jim Lynch of Desktop Linux Reviews reviewed the 5.5 release, Brigantia, and described it as "well-ordered and well developed" and recommended it to users whether they care about only using free software or not. Lynch stated that the release was suitable for beginners and advanced users.

Chris Fisher and Matt Hartley of The Linux Action Show! praised the design, ease of use, and hardware support of Trisquel 5.5 and Trisquel 5.5 Mini, but found that the Linux-libre kernel found in Trisquel impedes functionality of proprietary wireless devices. They argued that the distribution was targeting power users and that new users should use a different distribution.

Jesse Smith also reviewed Trisquel 7.0 in 2014, writing "Whenever I boot up Trisquel I find myself wondering whether the free software only distribution will be able to hold its own when it comes to hardware drivers, multimedia support and productivity software. The answer I came to when running Trisquel 7.0 is that, yes, the distribution appears to be nearly as capable as operating systems that do not stick to the FSF's definition of free software. Some people who use hardware that requires binary blobs or non-free drivers may face problems and Flash support isn't perfect when using the free Gnash player, but otherwise Trisquel appears to be every bit as functional as other mainstream Linux distributions. The software Trisquel ships with appears to be stable, functional and user friendly. The distribution is easy to install, I found it pleasant to use and I didn't encounter any problems. People who value or wish to promote free software should definitely try running Trisquel, it's an excellent example of what can be accomplished with free software."

Jack M. Germain of Tech News World said of the 9.0, release, Etiona: "Trisquel Linux is one of those computing staples you wished you knew about much sooner. This Linux distribution has been around literally for years and is extremely polished." and "Trisquel offers a family of Linux editions that meet or exceed the needs of home users, small enterprises, and educational centers. Trisquel can also be an ideal platform for multimedia workstations."

Smith then reviewed the 11.0 release, Aramo, in 2023, opining: "Trisquel is doing a great job presenting the world with what can be achieved by using free software only. However, using it also reminds me of the (sometimes harsh) limitations a free software only system imposes. ... This is, of course, the point of Trisquel, being a beacon of free-only software. People who download Trisquel probably are not interested in non-free components (software or hardware). This distribution offers a narrower path to walk, but it is a very smooth, pretty path."

Also reviewing Aramo, Jack Wallen of ZDNet complained of glitches during installation and criticized the use of an older kernel and a "boring" user interface, but concluded: "[i]f you want a rock-solid desktop distribution, and don't mind using UI that looks and feels like Windows from a bygone era, give Trisquel a try. If you want a reliable desktop with a more flexible (but still out-of-date) desktop, check out Triskel. Either way, they both offer Debian-like stability, with the additional option of a netinstall to land you with a server operating system that includes a similar reliability."

Richard Stallman has mentioned that he is using Trisquel on a Thinkpad X200 with GNU Boot as of 2022, and has previously used the Lemote Yeeloong.

== Hardware ==
IA-32 and x86-64 CPU architectures were supported since Trisquel 2.0, which includes free software compatible chipsets. However, IA-32 support was dropped with the release of Trisquel 10. Support for 32-bit ARM processors with a floating point unit (armhf) was added in the same release. 64-bit ARM and POWER support was added in Trisquel 11.0. RISC-V support was added in Trisquel 12.0.

== See also ==
- Comparison of Linux distributions
- List of Linux distributions#Ubuntu-based
