= GNU Project =

Free software project

GNU mascot, by Aurelio A. Heckert (derived from a more detailed version by Etienne Suvasa)

The GNU Project (/ɡnuː/ GNOO) is a free software, mass collaboration project announced by Richard Stallman on September 27, 1983. Its goal is to provide computer users freedom and control in their use of their computers and computing devices by developing and publishing software collaboratively that grants everyone the right to freely run, copy, distribute, study, and modify it. GNU software grants these rights in its license.

In order to ensure that the entire software of a computer grants its users all rights (use, share, study, modify), even the most fundamental and important parts, the operating system and all of its utility programs, need to be free software. Stallman decided to call this operating system GNU (a recursive acronym for "GNU's not Unix!"), basing its design on that of Unix, a proprietary operating system. According to its manifesto, the founding goal of the project was to build a free operating system, and if possible, "everything useful that normally comes with a Unix system so that one could get along without any software that is not free." Development was initiated in January 1984. In 1991, the Linux kernel appeared, developed outside the GNU Project by Linus Torvalds, and in December 1992, it was made available under version 2 of the GNU General Public License. Combined with the operating system utilities already developed by the GNU Project, it allowed for the first operating system that was free software, commonly known as Linux.

The project's current work includes software development, awareness building, political campaigning, and sharing of new material.

== Origins ==
In the late 1970s, Richard Stallman had an issue with a new printer installed in the MIT AI Lab, where he worked at the time, which ran proprietary firmware. Richard Stallman was frustrated that he could not receive a copy of the printer software and edit the code to solve his problem. This early experience led him to believe that the limits of non-free software are a social issue.

Richard Stallman announced his intent to start coding the GNU Project in a Usenet message in September 1983. Despite never having used Unix prior, Stallman felt that it was the most appropriate system design to use as a basis for the GNU Project, as it was portable and "fairly clean".

When the GNU Project first started it had an Emacs text editor with Lisp for writing editor commands, a source level debugger, a yacc-compatible parser generator, and a linker. The GNU system required its own C compiler and tools to be free software, so these also had to be developed. By June 1987, the project had accumulated and developed free software for an assembler, an almost finished portable optimizing C compiler (GCC), an editor (GNU Emacs), and various Unix utilities (such as ls, grep, awk, make and ld). Richard Stallman also mentioned in the GNU manifesto that an initial kernel exists for the GNU operating system. That kernel was soon revealed to be the TRIX kernel. Developers attempted to use TRIX as the base of the GNU kernel, but abandoned the effort in favour of GNU Mach.

Once the kernel and the compiler were finished, GNU was able to be used for program development. The main goal was to create many other applications to be like the Unix system. GNU was able to run Unix programs, but was not identical to it. GNU incorporated longer file names, file version numbers, and a crash-proof file system. The GNU Manifesto was written to gain support and participation from others for the project. Programmers were encouraged to take part in any aspect of the project that interested them. People could donate funds, computer parts, or even their own time to write code and programs for the project.

The origins and development of most aspects of the GNU Project (and free software in general) are shared in a detailed narrative in the Emacs help system. (C-h g runs the Emacs editor command describe-gnu-project.) It is the same detailed history as at their web site.

== GNU Manifesto ==
The GNU Manifesto was written by Richard Stallman to gain support and participation in the GNU Project. In the manifesto, Stallman listed four freedoms essential to software users: freedom to run a program for any purpose, freedom to study the mechanics of the program and modify it, freedom to redistribute copies, and freedom to improve and change modified versions for public use (see also Gratis versus libre). To implement these freedoms, users needed full access to the source code. To ensure code remained free and provide it to the public, Stallman created the GNU General Public License (GPL), which allowed software and the future generations of code derived from it to remain free for public use.

== Philosophy and activism ==
Although most of the GNU Project's output is technical in nature, it was launched as a social, ethical, and political initiative. As well as producing software and licenses, the GNU Project has published a number of writings, many of which were authored by Richard Stallman.

== Free software ==
The GNU Project uses software that is free for users to copy, edit, and distribute. It is free in the sense that users can change the software to fit individual needs. The way programmers obtain the free software depends on where they get it. The software could be provided to the programmer from friends or over the Internet, or the company a programmer works for may purchase the software.

== Funding ==
Proceeds from Free Software Foundation associate members, purchases, and donations support the GNU Project.

== Copyright, GNU licenses, and stewardship ==
The GNU Project recommends that contributors assign the copyright for GNU packages to the Free Software Foundation, though the Free Software Foundation considers it acceptable to release small changes to an existing project to the public domain. However, this is not required; package maintainers may retain copyright to the GNU packages they maintain, though since only the copyright holder may enforce the license used (such as the GNU GPL), the copyright holder in this case enforces it rather than the Free Software Foundation.

For the development of needed software, Stallman wrote a license called the GNU General Public License (first called Emacs General Public License), with the goal to guarantee users freedom to share and change free software. Stallman wrote this license after his experience with James Gosling and a program called UniPress, over a controversy around software code use in the GNU Emacs program. For most of the 80s, each GNU package had its own license: the Emacs General Public License, the GCC General Public License, etc. In 1989, FSF published a single license they could use for all their software, and which could be used by non-GNU projects: the GNU General Public License (GPL).

This license is now used by most of GNU software, as well as a large number of free software programs that are not part of the GNU Project; it also historically has been the most commonly used free software license (though recently challenged by the MIT license). It gives all recipients of a program the right to run, copy, modify and distribute it, while forbidding them from imposing further restrictions on any copies they distribute. This idea is often referred to as copyleft.

In 1991, the GNU Lesser General Public License (LGPL), then known as the Library General Public License, was written for the GNU C Library to allow it to be linked with proprietary software. 1991 also saw the release of version 2 of the GNU GPL. The GNU Free Documentation License (FDL), for documentation, followed in 2000. The GPL and LGPL were revised to version 3 in 2007, adding clauses to protect users against hardware restrictions that prevent users from running modified software on their own devices.

Besides GNU's packages, the GNU Project's licenses can and are used by many unrelated projects, such as the Linux kernel, often used with GNU software. A majority of free software such as the X Window System, is licensed under permissive free software licenses.

== Copyleft ==
Copyleft licenses help maintain free use of this software among other programmers. Copyleft gives everyone the legal right to use, edit, and redistribute programs or programs' code as long as the distribution terms do not change. As a result, any user who obtains the software legally has the same freedoms as the rest of its users do.

The GNU Project and the Free Software Foundation sometimes differentiate between "strong" and "weak" copyleft licenses. "Weak" copyleft programs typically allow distributors to link them together with non-free programs, while "strong" copyleft strictly forbids this practice. Most of the GNU Project's output is released under a strong copyleft, although some is released under a weak copyleft or a lax, push-over free software license.

== Operating system development ==
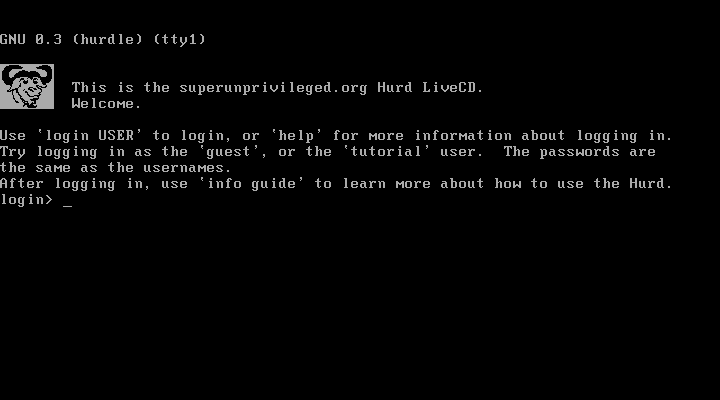
GNU Hurd live CD

The first goal of the GNU Project was to create a whole free-software operating system. Because UNIX was already widespread and ran on more powerful machines, compared to contemporary CP/M or MS-DOS machines of time, it was decided it would be a Unix-like operating system. Richard Stallman later commented that he considered MS-DOS "a toy".

By 1992, the GNU Project had completed all of the major operating system utilities, but had not completed their proposed operating system kernel, GNU Hurd. With the release of the Linux kernel for the first time under the GPLv2 with version 0.12 in 1992—the project was started independently by Linus Torvalds in 1991 but not under GPL—it was possible to run an operating system composed completely of free software. Though the Linux kernel is not part of the GNU Project, it was developed using GCC and other GNU programming tools and was released as free software under the GNU General Public License. Most compilation of the Linux kernel is still done with GNU toolchains, but it is currently possible to use the Clang compiler and the LLVM toolchain for compilation.

As of present, the GNU Project has not released a version of GNU/Hurd that is suitable for production environments since the commencement of the GNU/Hurd project over 35 years ago.

=== GNU Free System Distribution Guidelines ===
The GNU Free System Distribution Guidelines (GNU FSDG) is a system distribution commitment that explains how an installable system distribution (such as a Linux distribution) qualifies as free (libre), and helps distribution developers make their distributions qualify.

The list mostly describes distributions that are a combination of GNU packages with a Linux-libre kernel (a modified Linux kernel that removes binary blobs, obfuscated code, and portions of code under proprietary licenses) and consist only of free software (eschewing proprietary software entirely). Distributions that have adopted the GNU FSDG include Dragora GNU/Linux-Libre, GNU Guix System, Hyperbola GNU/Linux-libre, Parabola GNU/Linux-libre, Trisquel GNU/Linux, PureOS, and a few others.

In 2022, Debian was close to becoming a FSF endorsed distro but it had another repository on its servers with non-free packages, therefore it did not become FSF endorsed. Debian 12 added an option in its installer for non-free hardware to work by running non-free code.

The Fedora Project's distribution license guidelines were used as a basis for the FSDG. The Fedora Project's own guidelines, however, currently do not follow the FSDG, and thus the GNU Project does not consider Fedora to be a fully free (libre) GNU/Linux distribution.

== Strategic projects ==
From the mid-1990s onward, with many companies investing in free software development, the Free Software Foundation redirected its funds toward the legal and political support of free software development. Software development from that point on focused on maintaining existing projects, and starting new projects only when there was an acute threat to the free software community. One of the most notable projects of the GNU Project is the GNU Compiler Collection, whose components have been adopted as the standard compiler system on many Unix-like systems.

The copyright of most works by the GNU Project is owned by the Free Software Foundation.

=== GNOME ===
The GNOME desktop effort was launched by the GNU Project because another desktop system, KDE, was becoming popular, but required users to install Qt, which was then proprietary software. To prevent people from being tempted to install KDE and Qt, the GNU Project simultaneously launched two projects. One was the Harmony toolkit. This was an attempt to make a free software replacement for Qt. Had this project been successful, the perceived problem with the KDE would have been solved. The second project was GNOME, which tackled the same issue from a different angle. It aimed to make a replacement for KDE that had no dependencies on proprietary software. The Harmony project did not make much progress, but GNOME developed very well. Eventually, the proprietary component that KDE depended on (Qt) was released as free software. GNOME has since dissociated itself from the GNU Project and the Free Software Foundation, and is now independently managed by the GNOME Project.

=== GNU Enterprise ===
GNU Enterprise (GNUe) was a meta-project started in 1996, and can be regarded as a sub-project of the GNU Project. GNUe's goal is to create free "enterprise-class data-aware applications" (enterprise resource planners, etc.). GNUe is designed to collect Enterprise software for the GNU system in a single location (much like the GNOME project collects Desktop software), it was later decommissioned.

== Recognition ==
In 2001, the GNU Project received the USENIX Lifetime Achievement Award for "the ubiquity, breadth, and quality of its freely available redistributable and modifiable software, which has enabled a generation of research and commercial development".

== See also ==
- Free Software Foundation
- GNU Free Documentation License
- List of GNU packages
- 9965 GNU
