= DistroWatch =

Website displaying info about free software Unix-like distributions

- Website type: News website
- Available in: English (Note: Site contents are in English while some user interface elements are also available in Arabic, Danish, Dutch, French, German, Hebrew, Hindi, Japanese, Persian, Polish, Portuguese, Romanian, Russian, Spanish, Swedish, Tamil, Turkish, Ukrainian, Vietnamese.)
- Owner: Ladislav Bodnar
- Revenue: Advertisement
- Website: distrowatch.com
- IPv6 support: Yes
- Commercial: Yes
- Registration: No
- Launched: 31 May 2001

DistroWatch is a website that provides news, distribution pages hit rankings, and other general information about various Linux distributions as well as other free software/open source Unix-like operating systems. It now contains information on several hundred distributions and a few hundred distributions labeled as active.

== History ==
The website was launched on 31 May 2001 and is maintained by Ladislav Bodnar.

Initially, Bodnar also wrote the Distrowatch Weekly (DWW). In November 2008, Bodnar decided to step down from the post of editor for DWW. Bodnar said he would continue to maintain the site while the DWW would be written by Chris Smart.

As of 2017, DistroWatch has donated a total of US$47,739 to various open source software projects since the launch of the Donations Program in March 2004.

== Features ==
The site maintains extensive comparison charts detailing differences between the package sets and software revisions of different distributions. It also provides some general characteristics of distributions such as the price and the supported processor architectures. (Note: e.g. see the Red Hat Enterprise Linux page on the web site https://distrowatch.com/table.php?distribution=redhat) There is also a Distrowatch weekly (often abbreviated DWW) that comes out every Monday "as a publication summarising the happenings in the distribution world on a weekly basis".

Distrowatch has a monthly donations program, a joint initiative between DistroWatch and two online shops selling low-cost CDs and DVDs with Linux, BSD and other open source software.

The database consists of hundreds of different open source distributions, mainly Linux but also BSD and Solaris. It also has a small number categorized as "Other OS", namely ReactOS, Haiku, KolibriOS, RISC OS and Minix.

== Page rankings ==
Distrowatch itself affirms that its page rankings are "a light-hearted way of measuring the popularity of Linux distributions and other free operating systems among the visitors of this website. They correlate neither to usage nor to quality, and should not be used to measure the market share of distributions. They simply show the number of times a distribution page on DistroWatch.com was accessed each day, nothing more."

PC World has written that "the page-hit counts on DistroWatch give some indication of which distributions are drawing the most interest at the moment, of course, but such measures can't be assumed to gauge who's actually using what or which are preferred overall".

== Facebook ==
On January 19, 2025, Facebook began taking down posts that included "DistroWatch" on the basis that "Linux is malware". DistroWatch's Facebook account is currently locked. In a later statement, DistroWatch indicated that Facebook had lifted the ban. Facebook stated that the censorship of Linux groups and topics was "in error" and that the mistake and the underlying issue had been rectified.
