= LIX Corps =

LIX Corps or 59th Corps may refer to:

- 59th Corps (German Empire)
- LIX Army Corps, Wehrmacht, Germany
- 59th (2nd Eastern Artisans) Lanarkshire Rifle Volunteer Corps, United Kingdom
- 59th (Leyland) Lancashire Rifle Volunteer Corps, United Kingdom

== See also ==
- List of military corps by number
- 58th Army (disambiguation)
- 58th Brigade (disambiguation)
- 58th Division (disambiguation)
- 58th Regiment (disambiguation)
- 58th Squadron (disambiguation)
- 58th (disambiguation)
- LIX (disambiguation)
