= LVIII Corps =

LVIII Corps or 58th Corps may refer to:

- 58th Corps (German Empire)
- LVIII Panzer Corps, Wehrmacht, Germany
- 58th (1st Eastern Artisans) Lanarkshire Rifle Volunteer Corps, United Kingdom

== See also ==
- List of military corps by number
- 58th Army (disambiguation)
- 58th Brigade (disambiguation)
- 58th Division (disambiguation)
- 58th Regiment (disambiguation)
- 58th Squadron (disambiguation)
- 58th (disambiguation)
