= 58th Army =

58th Army may refer to:

- Fifty-Eighth Army (Japan), Imperial Japanese Army
- 58th Guards Combined Arms Army, Soviet Union/Russia

== See also ==
- List of armies by number
- 58th Division (disambiguation)
- 58th Brigade (disambiguation)
- 58th Regiment (disambiguation)
- 58th Squadron (disambiguation)
- 58th (disambiguation)
