= Eelco =

Eelco is a given name of Dutch origin. Notable people with the name include:

- Eelco Alta (1723–1798), Frisian clergyman, theologian, and veterinarian
- Eelco Dolstra, Dutch software engineer who developed the Nix software deployment method
- Eelco Eerenberg (born 1984), Dutch politician
- Eelco Gelling (born 1946), Dutch blues guitarist
- Eelco Heinen (born 1981), Dutch politician
- Eelco Horsten (born 1989), Dutch professional footballer
- Eelco Jansen (born 1969), Dutch baseball player
- Eelco Schattorie (born 1971), Dutch football manager
- Eelco Sintnicolaas (born 1987), Dutch athlete, specialising in the decathlon
- Eelco Uri (born 1973), Dutch Olympic water polo player
- Eelco van Asperen (1965–2013), Dutch computer scientist
- Eelco van Kleffens (1894–1983), politician and diplomat of The Netherlands
- Eelco Visser (1966–2022), Dutch computer scientist
- Eelco Wassenaar (born 1973), American Olympic field hockey player
