= 58th =

58th is the ordinal form of the number 58. 58th or Fifty-eighth may also refer to:

- A fraction, 1/58, equal to one of 58 equal parts

== Geography ==
- 58th meridian east, a line of longitude
- 58th meridian west, a line of longitude
- 58th parallel north, a circle of latitude
- 58th parallel south, a circle of latitude
- 58th Street (disambiguation)

== Military ==
- Fifty-Eighth Army (Japan)
- 58th Guards Combined Arms Army, Russian Ground Forces
- 58th Brigade (disambiguation)
- 58th Division (disambiguation)
- 58th Regiment (disambiguation)
- 58th Squadron (disambiguation)
- 58th Special Operations Wing, U.S. Air Force

== Other ==
- 58th century
- 58th century BC
- 58th Texas Legislature
- 58th United States Congress
- Fifty-eighth session of the United Nations General Assembly
- Fifty-eighth Amendment of the Constitution of India
- 58th (film), 2026 Philippine adult animated biographical drama film

== See also ==
- 58 (disambiguation)
