= Wassenaar (disambiguation) =

Wassenaar is a municipality and town in the province of South Holland, The Netherlands.

Wassenaar may also refer to:

- Wassenaar Arrangement, an export control regime
- Wassenaar Arrangement semi-automatic Rifles, an assault rifle family
- Wassenaar Agreement, a 1982 agreement between labour unions and employers' organizations
- Carrie Wassenaar, a character on What If...? (TV series)
- Eelco Wassenaar (born 1973), American former field hockey player and Olympian
- HNLMS Wassenaar, ships of the Royal Netherlands Navy

== See also ==
- Van Wassenaer, a Dutch Noble family that were the original inhabitants of Wassenaar
