= Bootstrappable builds =

Bootstrappable builds is a process of compiling software that does not depend on (compiler) binaries that are not built from source by this process.

This process can protect against compiler backdoors: if the build process does not depend on binary code that is difficult to audit, then a compiler backdoor cannot be hidden in compiler binaries anymore.

Bootstrappable builds minimize dependence on opaque, precompiled tools used to build software. The required compilers and build tools are constructed from source through successive stages, beginning with a small and auditable bootstrap seed.

== Methods ==
A way to tackle the issue for a software distribution is to reduce the size of the binaries used to bootstrap the distribution until there are not needed anymore or that the size is small enough to be easily reviewed by humans.

Many compilers for various programming languages are written in the language they target. For instance, the official Go compiler (gc) is written in Go.

So, without alternative compilers like GCC that are written in another programming language (here in C and C++), the Go compiler would require a binary of a previous version of the Go compiler binary to be built.

To achieve bootstrappable builds, it is often possible to find an older version of the compiler that can be built from source. From there, one can write code to automatically build successive versions of the compiler until a recent version is reached. Identifying which versions can build which others is often non-trivial and can result in very long compilation times during the bootstrap process. This sometimes also requires maintaining older compiler versions and backporting support for newer CPU architectures to enable bootstrapping on modern systems. For example, GCC 4.7 is the last version that can be compiled using tcc, but it can then be used to compile newer versions of GCC.

This process can also be replaced or combined with other ways to bootstrap compilers.

For instance, it is also possible to write a new compiler for a language, that is written in another language.

These techniques can be used to reduce the size of the binaries used to bootstrap a distribution.

As for building the first compiler that can build the subsequent compilers, it is possible to reduce the size to a single 357-byte binary and from that use multiple stages in the bootstrapping procedure to be able to build a C compiler, and from that build the other compilers or software.

== Challenges ==
Software can depend on itself for compiling and the first version could've been compiled in a way that is not bootstrappable.

Gradle is one such case as it depends on Scala, which had a proprietary dependency in its first release, and Kotlin, which depends on itself and Gradle to be compiled.

== History ==
The Bootstrappable Builds project was started in 2016 as a spin-off of the Reproducible Builds project.

In 2022, Guix gained the ability to be built from the aforementioned 357 bytes binary.

== See also ==
- Reproducible builds
