= System distribution =

A system distribution is a collection of software designed to be installed into a computer and may refer to:

- Guix System Distribution, intertwined with cross-platform package manager GNU Guix
- Berkeley Software Distribution
- Linux distribution
