= Hemel =

Hemel may refer to:

== Places ==
- Hemel Hempstead

== Sport ==
- Hemel Hempstead Town F.C., an association football club
- Hemel Stags, a rugby league club

== Science ==
- Trade name for altretamine

== Popular culture ==
- Hemel (film), a 2012 Dutch film

== People ==
- Armijn Hemel
- Mark Hemel (born 1966), Dutch architect and designer
