= Reproducibility (disambiguation) =

Reproducibility is an aspect of scientific research.

It may also refer to:

- Fertility and fecundity, the reproductive capacity of organisms
- Reproducible builds, reproducibility in the context of computer software
