= Lix =

Lix or LIX is 59 in roman numerals. It may also refer to:

== Places and institutions ==
- Lycée International Xavier (LIX), a private school in Seoul, Korea
- Lix Toll, a road junction in Scotland

== People ==
- Lisa Lix (born 1966), Canadian health scientist and biostatistician
- Lix da Cunha (1896–1984), a Brazilian engineer and architect

== Sports ==
- Super Bowl LIX, the 59th NFL championship match.

== Science and technology ==
- Lix (readability test), a readability measure indicating the difficulty of reading a text
- Lix, a community-maintained, FOSS fork of the Nix package manager and programming language
