= VibeOS =

Artificial intelligence operating system

- Original author: kaanse
- Written in: C
- Platform: AArch64
- Available in: English
- License: MIT License
- Repository: github.com/kaansenol5/VibeOS

VibeOS is an operating system built from scratch mainly using generative artificial intelligence, with code produced through prompts to Claude as part of a vibe coding workflow. It is capable of running on QEMU and was successfully tested on a Raspberry Pi Zero 2 W. It has been released under the MIT License.

== Features ==
=== Core ===
- Custom kernel with cooperative multitasking (preemptive backup)
- FAT32 filesystem with long filename support
- Memory allocator, process scheduler, interrupt handling
- GIC-400 (QEMU) and BCM2836/BCM2835 (Pi) interrupt controllers
- Configurable boot (splash screen, boot target)

=== GUI ===
- Desktop environment with draggable windows
- Menu bar, dock, window minimize/maximize/close
- Mouse and keyboard input
- Modern macOS-inspired aesthetic

=== Networking ===
- Full TCP/IP stack (Ethernet, ARP, IP, ICMP, UDP, TCP)
- DNS resolver
- HTTP client
- TLS 1.2 with HTTPS support

=== Apps ===
- Web browser with HTML/CSS rendering
- Terminal emulator with readline-style shell
- Text editor (vim clone) with syntax highlighting
- File manager with drag-and-drop
- Music player (MP3/WAV)
- Calculator, system monitor
- VibeCode IDE
- Doom port

=== Development ===
- TCC (Tiny C Compiler) - compile C programs directly on VibeOS
- MicroPython interpreter with full kernel API bindings
- 60+ userspace programs (coreutils, games, GUI apps)

=== Hardware ===
- Runs on Raspberry Pi Zero 2W
- USB keyboard and mouse via DWC2 driver
- SD card via EMMC driver
- 1920×1080 framebuffer

== Further projects ==
There are other independent projects under the VibeOS name, including an independent development by Ben, also developed using vibe coding, aimed at creating a Unix-like operating system for educational purposes.

Another project is Vib-OS, an operating system also built using vibe coding, capable of booting on a Raspberry Pi. It offers a desktop environment with a customizable wallpaper, a file manager, and a web browser currently in an early stage of development, a functional Doom port, among other features that are not very polished given the state of development.
