= Maak =

- Original author(s): Eelco Dolstra
- Stable release: 0.3 / December 6, 2002; 22 years ago
- Written in: Haskell
- Platform: Linux, Unix-like
- Type: Build automation
- License: LGPL
- Website: nixos.org/~eelco/maak/

In computing, Maak is a utility similar to make, designed to build complex software systems while avoiding the need to recompile the entire system every time a change is made. "Maak" is Dutch for "make".

== See also ==
- Nix package manager
