= Eelco Visser =

Dutch computer scientist and professor (1966–2022)

- Born: 12 October 1966; Rijswijk, Netherlands
- Died: 5 April 2022 (aged 55); Utrecht, Netherlands
- Education: University of Amsterdam (MSc 1993; PhD 1997)
- Notable work: Spoofax, WebDSL, Nix
- Scientific career
- Fields: Computer science, programming language engineering
- Workplaces: Oregon Graduate Institute (1997-1998); Utrecht University (1998-2006); Delft University of Technology
- Website: eelcovisser.org

Eelco Visser (12 October 1966 – 5 April 2022) was a Dutch computer scientist, an Antonie van Leeuwenhoek Professor of Computer Science at Delft University of Technology (TU Delft).

== Academic career ==
Visser was born in Rijswijk. He received an Master of Science (MSc), and Doctor of Philosophy (PhD) in computer science from the University of Amsterdam in 1993 and 1997, respectively. Formerly, he served as a Postdoc at the Oregon Graduate Institute from 1997 to 1998, as assistant professor at Utrecht University from 1998 to 2006, and as associate professor at TU Delft from 2006 to 2013.

Visser published over 100 publications in conferences and journals. His research included contributions to declarative programming syntax definition and parsing (Syntax Definition Formalism (SDF/SGLR)), high-level definition of program transformations (Stratego/XT), language workbenches (Spoofax), modular programming language definition, domain-specific languages for web programming (WebDSL:mobl), and declarative models for (distributed) software deployment via package manager (Nix), the basis of the Linux distribution NixOS. He was the project leader of the NWO (Jacquard) projects TraCE, TFA, MoDSE, and PDS, which have produced several open source software systems used in research and industry. In 2013 he received the prestigious NWO VICI grant for research into verification of language definitions.

Visser was an active member of the programming languages community and served on many program committees of the important conferences in the field including Object-Oriented Programming, Systems, Languages & Applications (OOPSLA), European Conference on Object-Oriented Programming (ECOOP), MODELS, SLE, and GPCE. He had been a general chair of the Association for Computing Machinery (ACM) International Conference on Generative Programming and Component Engineering (GPCE 2010), and program chair of the International Conference on Model Transformation (ICMT 2011) and of Onward! 2011. He was member of the steering committees of SPLASH, Onward!, ICMT, and Generative Programming: Concepts & Experience (GPCE), and chaired the latter. He was founding member of the International Federation for Information Processing (IFIP) Working Groups 2.11 (Program Generation) and 2.16 (Language Design), and he served as chair of the latter. Eelco Visser had created program-transformation.org web site in 2000 for collecting, organizing and disseminating information about all aspects of program transformation.
