= 58 =

58 may refer to:

- 58 (number), the natural number following 57 and preceding 59
- one of the years 58 BC, AD 58, 1958, 2058
- 58 (band), an American rock band
- 58 (golf), a round of 58 in golf
- "Fifty Eight", a song by Karma to Burn from the album Arch Stanton, 2014
- +58, the international calling code for Venezuela

== See also ==
- 58th (disambiguation)
- 58 Concordia, a main-belt asteroid
