= Nikolai Bobyr =

Russian general

General of the Cavalry Nikolai Pavlovich Bobyr
- Born: 14 January 1854; Malaya Zagorovka, Chernigov Governorate, Russian Empire (today in Ukraine)
- Died: December 1920 (aged 66); Yalta, RSFSR
- Military career
- Allegiance: (Russian Empire) Imperial Russian Army
- Service years: 1873–1918
- Rank: General of the cavalry
- Commands: 49th Dragoon Arkhangelogorod Regiment; 1st Separate Cavalry Brigade; Novogeorgievsk Fortress
- Conflicts: Russo-Turkish War; World War I; Gorlice–Tarnów Offensive; Siege of Novogeorgievsk
- Awards: Order of Saint Stanislaus; Order of Saint Vladimir; Order of Saint Anna; Order of the White Eagle; Order of Saint Alexander Nevsky

Nikolai Pavlovich Bobyr (Russian: Николай Павлович Бобырь; Ukrainian: Микола Павлович Бобир; 14 January 1854 – December 1920) was an Imperial Russian Army general of the cavalry. He was commandant of the Novogeorgievsk Fortress from 1907 to 1915, and saw action there during World War I.

== Biography ==
Bobyr was the son of Colonel Pavel Matveyevich Bobyr. He graduated from the Petrovsky Poltava military gymnasium. In 1873 he graduated from the Mikhailovsky Artillery Academy. He served in the Imperial Russian Army horse artillery.

During the Russian-Turkish War of 1877–1878, Bobyr was part of the force guarding the Black Sea coast in the Odessa region. He was promoted to staff captain in 1879.

In April 1882 he graduated in the first category from the Nikolaev Academy of the General Staff. He then was assigned to the headquarters of the Kharkov Military District. On 24 November 1882 he became senior adjutant to the headquarters of the 5th Infantry Division.

=== In Siberia ===
On 28 October 1884, Bobyr was assigned duty as the ispravleniye dolzhnosti ("post correction") (Note: In the Russian Empire, ispravleniye dolzhnosti ("post correction") indicated the performance by an official of the military duties of a post, using all the rights established for this post, prior to receiving formal approval perform those duties. "Correction" of a post applied to those cases when 1) due to the absence of the person holding the position, duties were temporarily assigned to another person (in relation to more important posts, such as those held by ministers, governors, police officers, leaders of the nobility, judges, and prosecutors, the law indicated who was called and in what order they were called to re-establish — or "correct" — the position in the absence of the person holding it); 2) in order to test a person’s abilities before assigning that person permanently to the position, the person filled the post for a trial period of no more than four months, which counted in the person's active service in the post if the person later received a permanent assignment to the post; or 3) authorities appointed a person to a position that required imperial approval of the appointment prior to receiving an imperial order granting such approval, with the appointed person receiving a full salary until the issuance of the necessary imperial order for the person's appointment. When "correcting" a position, an official or a military officer filling the position received the salary assigned to him only if the position was vacant and if the official appointed to ("correcting") the position no longer received any other salary.) staff officer for assignments at the headquarters of the East Siberian Military District. From April 1884 to January 1885 served in Kamchatka to collect statistical information about the Kamchatka Cossacks. On 20 July 1884, during the reorganization of the East Siberian Military District into the Irkutsk Military District, he became headquarters officer for special assignments under the commander of the district. He was promoted to lieutenant colonel in 1885. From May to October 1887, he headed an expedition to the Sayan Mountains to study the border region of Irkutsk Province. He was promoted to colonel in 1890.

=== Cavalry service ===
On 27 February 1891 Bobyr assumed duty as the ispravleniye dolzhnosti ("post correction") chief of staff of the 2nd Cavalry Division. On 23 December 1892 he was seconded to the 8th Dragoon Smolensk Regiment for a practical study of the conditions of cavalry service. On 5 November 1894, he was seconded to the headquarters of the Vilna Military District. On 9 January 1895 he was appointed chief of staff of the 3rd Cavalry Division. On 15 September 1895, he was appointed commander of the 49th Dragoon Arkhangelogorod Regiment. From March to July 1908, he temporarily commanded the 1st Separate Cavalry Brigade. In 1911 he was promoted to general of the cavalry.

=== Fortress service ===
On 24 November 1899 Bobyr was appointed chief of staff of the Kovno Fortress. He was promoted to major general in 1899. On 24 July 1900, he became chief of staff of the Osovets Fortress. On 14 February 1907 he was appointed commandant of the Novogeorgievsk Fortress.

During World War I, Bobyr led the Russian defense of the fortress in July–August 1915, which culminated in the Imperial German Army's Siege of Novogeorgievsk of 10–25 August 1915. When German troops captured the fortress, he was captured. He became a prisoner of war in an officer's camp in Blankenburg, Germany.

== Later life ==
After World War I, he returned to Russia, where the Russian Civil War was underway. He lived in Yalta to rest and convalesce, and did not serve in the White Army. In December 1920, he was shot in Yalta by decision of the three Crimean strike groups of the special divisions of the Cheka under the Revolutionary Military Council of the Red Army's Southern and Southwestern Fronts.

== Personal life ==
Bobyr was married to Sofiya Leonidovna Karpinskaya. They had one daughter, Nadezhda (1891–1907).

== Awards and honors ==
- Order of Saint Stanislaus, Third Class (30 August 1884)
- Order of Saint Vladimir, Fourth Class (3 February 1886)
- Order of Saint Stanislaus, Second Class (6 May 1889)
- Order of Saint Anna, Second Class (21 May 1893)
- Order of Saint Vladimir, Third Class (14 May 1886)
- Order of Saint Stanislaus, First Class (6 December 1903)
- Order of Saint Anna, First Class (1 January 1906)
- Order of Saint Vladimir, Second Class (14 May 1886) (6 December 1909)
- Order of the White Eagle (6 December 1913)
- Order of Saint Alexander Nevsky (25 October 1914)
