= 58th Regiment of Foot (disambiguation) =

Three regiments of the British Army have been numbered the 58th Regiment of Foot:

- 47th (Lancashire) Regiment of Foot, 58th Regiment of Foot, numbered as the 58th Foot in 1747 and renumbered as the 47th in 1751
- 56th (West Essex) Regiment of Foot, 58th Regiment of Foot, raised in 1755 and renumbered as the 56th in 1756
- 58th (Rutlandshire) Regiment of Foot, raised as the 60th and renumbered as the 58th in 1756

== See also ==
- 58th Regiment (disambiguation)
