= 63rd Infantry Division (Russian Empire) =

- 63-я пехотная дивизия
- Active: 1914–1918
- Country: Russian Empire
- Branch: Russian Imperial Army
- Role: Infantry
- Engagements: World War I; Battle of the Vistula River; Siege of Novogeorgievsk

The 63rd Infantry Division (Russian: 63-я пехотная дивизия, 63-ya Pekhotnaya Diviziya) was an infantry formation of the Russian Imperial Army. The entire division surrendered during the fall of Novogeorgievsk.

== Organization ==
- 1st Brigade
  - 249th Infantry Regiment
  - 250th Infantry Regiment
- 2nd Brigade
  - 251st Infantry Regiment
  - 252nd Infantry Regiment
