= Siege of Novogeorgievsk =

World War I battle

- Part of the Eastern Front during World War I
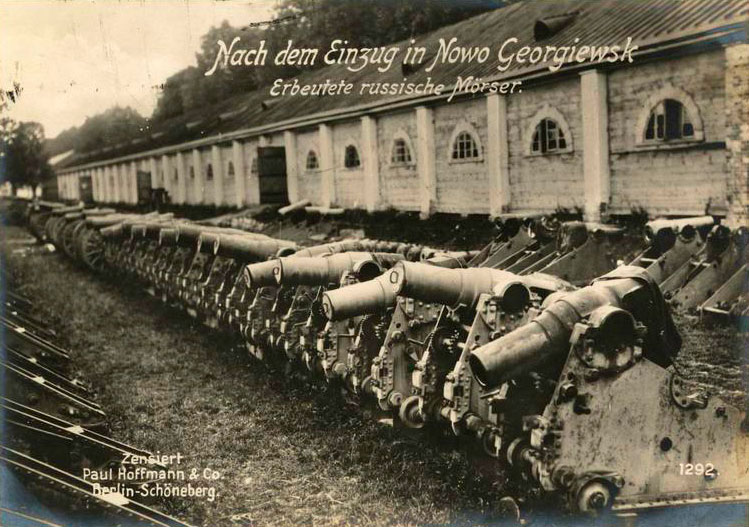
- Russian 8-inch mortars captured at Novogeorgievsk.
Date	10 August – 20 August 1915
Location	Novogeorgievsk, Russian Empire (now in Poland) 52°26′18″N 20°40′55″E
Result	German victory

Belligerents
German Empire	Russian Empire

Commanders and leaders
Hans Hartwig von Beseler	Nikolai Pavlovich Bobyr (surrendered)

Strength
80,000 men 390 guns	90,000 men 197 machine guns 1,253 guns

Casualties and losses
Several hundred men	Entire Garrison captured

The siege of Novogeorgievsk was a battle of World War I fought after the Germans broke the Russian defenses in Paul von Hindenburg's Bug–Narew offensive. In terms of the ratio of casualties and trophies, the German victory at Novogeorgievsk surpassed the victory at Tannenberg in 1914. It is also one of the most brilliant victories in world military history in capturing a heavily fortified fortress defended by superior enemy forces. Numerous Russian sources call the fall of Novogeorgievsk the most shameful page in the history of the Russian Imperial army.

== Background ==
As a result of the retreat of the Russian 1st and 2nd Armies during the German Bug–Narew offensive, the fortress of Novogeorgievsk was blocked from the south by the division of Lieutenant General Thilo von Westernhagen from the German 9th Army. The chief of staff of the Supreme Commander of All German Forces in the East E. Ludendorff sent M. von Gallwitz an order for a "parallel pursuit" of Russian troops along the Bug River in order to intercept their retreat to the east. The capture of Novogeorgievsk was entrusted to the Siege Corps of General Hans Hartwig von Beseler, while Ludendorff insisted on attacking the fortress from the east, from the confluence of the Bug and Vistula rivers, while Gallwitz considered it more convenient to attack from the north, where there were no water barriers.

== Comparison of strength ==
In Novogeorgievsk, at the time of isolation from the Russian field armies, there were 1,027 officers, 445 military officials and doctors, 90,214 soldiers (58th, 63rd, 114th, 119th infantry divisions (total 64 battalions), fortress artillery, engineering and construction units; combat strength - 37,552 infantry, 282 cavalry, 1626 sappers). The armament consisted of 197 machine guns, 1,253 guns. The fortress was well supplied with ammunition. For each barrel of heavy and fortress artillery of 4.2-inch calibre there were 660 shells, 1,030 of 4.8-inch, up to 900 of 6-inch, 600 of 8-inch, 153 of 10-inch, 960 anti-aircraft, 350 each of 57mm and 3-inch anti-assault, for half-pood mortars - 520 each, 49 missiles per rocket launcher. On the eve of the complete blockade, 4 million rifle cartridges arrived in the fortress from Ivangorod.

In the von Beseler group, 55 battalions were assembled, 10 squadrons, 69.5 batteries (390 guns), including heavy guns: six 42 cm, ten 30.5 cm, and eight 21 cm mortars, 44 15 cm howitzers, eight 15 cm, four 12 cm, and eight 10 cm guns. 1,000 shells were allocated for each light gun, 600 shells for heavy guns and howitzers, 400 shells for 21 cm mortars, and 200 shells for 30.5 cm and 42 cm mortars. For the most part, the infantry was represented by the Landwehr, Landsturm and reserve regiments; on the Russian side, the militia made up half of the garrison, but, unlike the Germans, they had no combat experience. On August 7, the H. von Beseler group was separated from the 12th Army and subordinated directly to the Supreme Commander of All German Forces in the East.

== Anti-Semitism in the Russian garrison of Novogeorgievsk ==
Spy mania, caused by anti-Semitic sentiments among the military environment of the Warsaw fortified region, worsened significantly with the outbreak of the First World War. This had a particularly strong impact on the morale of the garrison of the Novogeorgievsk fortress. The spread of rumors about countless Jewish betrayals and their complicity with the Germans, coupled with exaggerated ideas about the approaching German forces, undermined the morale of the soldiers. Since the beginning of the First World War, the persecution of spies in the fortress acquired increasingly grotesque and, as a rule, anti-Semitic in spirit forms, and sometimes the reason for this was the unjustified actions of the command itself. An eyewitness to these events recalls that the departure from Novogeorgievsk of a Jewish family running a leather shop, often visited by soldiers, was assessed by them unequivocally: “Spies, of course.”

The order to the troops of the fortified area, Novogeorgievsk fortress, dated November 27, 1914, signed by Nikolai Bobyr, read: “... when occupying populated areas, take hostages from the Jewish population, warning that in the event of treasonous activity of any of the local residents, the hostages will be executed” (and this despite the fact that Jews made up more than half of the population of Novogeorgievsk and its environs - Novy Dvor was generally populated almost exclusively by them). Later, in May 1915, apparently not satisfied with the results of the local implementation of such a policy, Russian Headquarters issued an order to practice taking Jews hostage along the entire front.

Particularly serious damage to the morale of the garrison was caused by the death of the chief of engineers of the fortress, Colonel Korotkevich-Nochevny, who was killed during an inspection of forward positions. On the trip he was accompanied by the chief of engineers of the Northern Department of the fortress, Colonel Khudzinsky (killed), engineer of the Vymyslovsky sector of the same department Korshun (wounded) and his assistant - a sapper officer (captured along with the driver of the car). Gossip transformed this tragic incident into a voluntary transition with a lot of vital documentation to the enemy’s side of the chief of defense of the southern department of the fortress, Major General A. Krenke, who did not participate in the trip at all.

However, these rumors had a reliable basis, since the Germans captured Korotkevich’s portfolio, the general plan for the fortifications of Novogeorgievsk, indicating the locations of heavy batteries. Thus, in one day the garrison’s trust in the high command was undermined and the entire system of Novogeorgievsk fortifications, until that moment unknown to the Germans, was exposed.

Thus, both the officials from the front command headquarters and the officers of the Novogeorgievsk garrison itself, through ill-considered actions, only raised the level of anti-Semitism in the military environment, in the region most densely populated by Jews. The demoralization of the Russian troops - perhaps the main factor in the failure of the defense of Novogeorgievsk in August 1915 - was quite natural and expected under such conditions.

== Battle ==
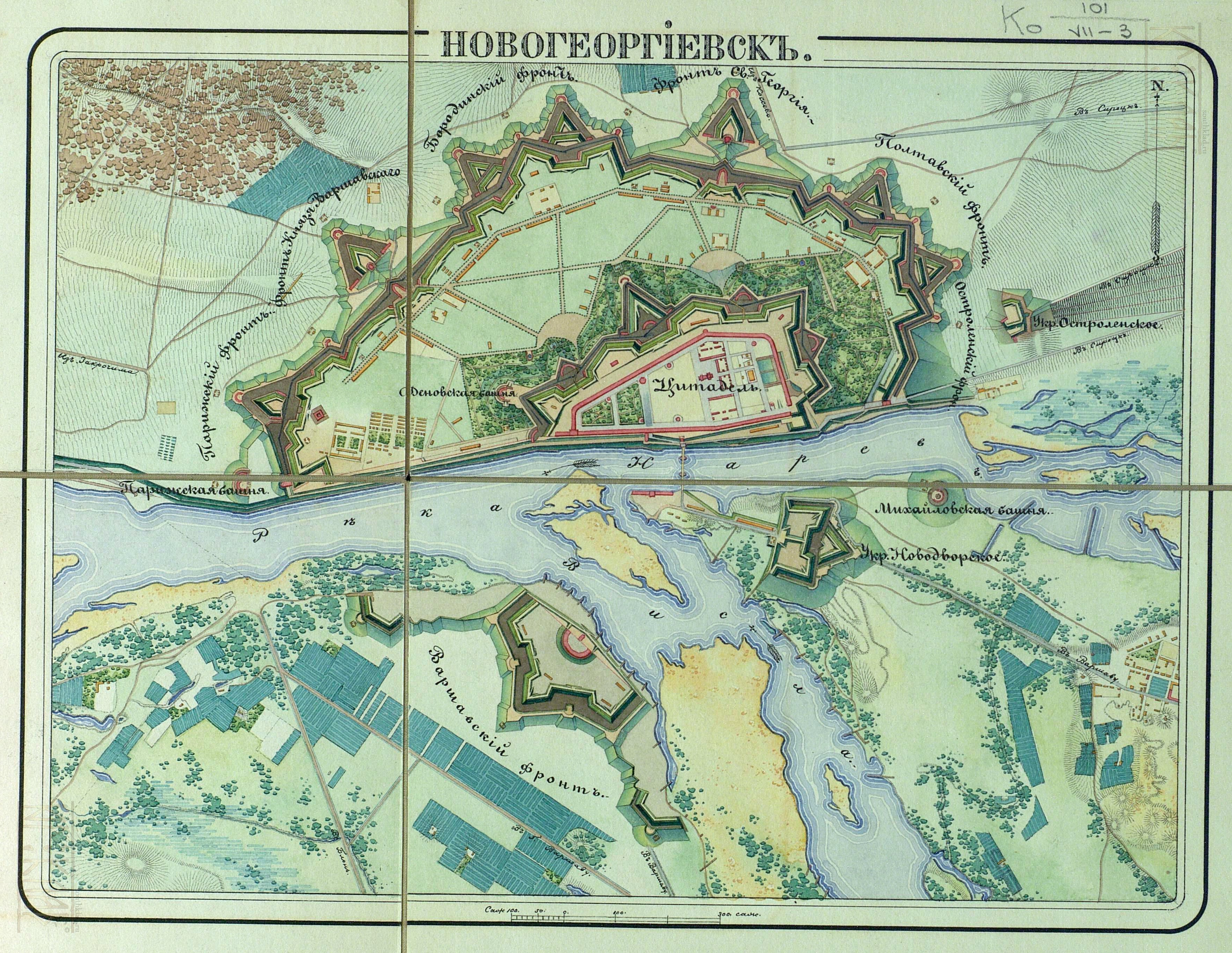
Fortress plan

Novogeorgievsk was surrounded on 10 August and the bombardment began few days later and was concentrated on the north-eastern portion of the defenses, lying north of the Vistula River. The German assault was helped after the capture of the fort's Chief Inspector with detailed plans of the fort's defences. After a 3-day bombardment, on August 16, X. von Beseler's corps proceeded to storm the forts in the northeastern and eastern parts of the outer belt of forts. Colonel T. von Pfeil's brigade captured forts XV and XVb by 4 p.m. and had 150 prisoners in them; the 10th and 38th Landwehr Regiments, after a stubborn battle, captured Fort XVa by 2 a.m. Attacks on forts XVla and XVIb near Charnovo were repulsed by the garrison.

Against the forts of the northeastern (Pomekhovsky) defense sector of Novogeorgievsk, the attacks of the Germans continued. The attempts of the garrison to recapture the forts of group XV were unsuccessful, the commander of the 455th infantry regiment, Colonel S. Shiryaev, died in counterattacks: the 21st and Pfeil Brigades were sent to the forts of group XVI, but their attack was repelled by the garrison. At the same time, after shelling by the forces of the 169th Landwehr Brigade, the forts of Group XIV were attacked. Major General P. Venevitinov, commander of the Pomekhovsky sector, ordered to clear the forts and retreat to the second line of defense, blowing up the fortifications. But it turned out that there was no stock of pyroxylin in the forts, and the sappers sent for it did not return. The forts fell into the hands of the Germans in complete safety. On the evening of August 17, the commandant of the fortress Nikolai Bobyr ordered to retreat across the Wkra River, to the redoubts of the main bypass of the fortress. Since the airfield in Modlin was under the threat of shelling, it was decided to evacuate the vehicles with crews, and burn 5 faulty ones. On 9 planes, 12 officers and 5 lower ranks flew out of the fortress, secret files, the standard of the fortress and a supply of golden Crosses of St. George were taken out; along the way, one aircraft went missing.

On August 18, in Novogeorgievsk, the siege artillery of X. von Beseler's group was moved to new positions, closer to the second belt of forts; the forts of the Zakrochimsky and Vymyslovsky sectors were captured. The chief of staff of the fortress, Major General N. Globachev, telegraphed to the staff of the North-Western Front that there was no hope of holding Novogeorgievsk, the defense on the inner belt could last no more than one day.

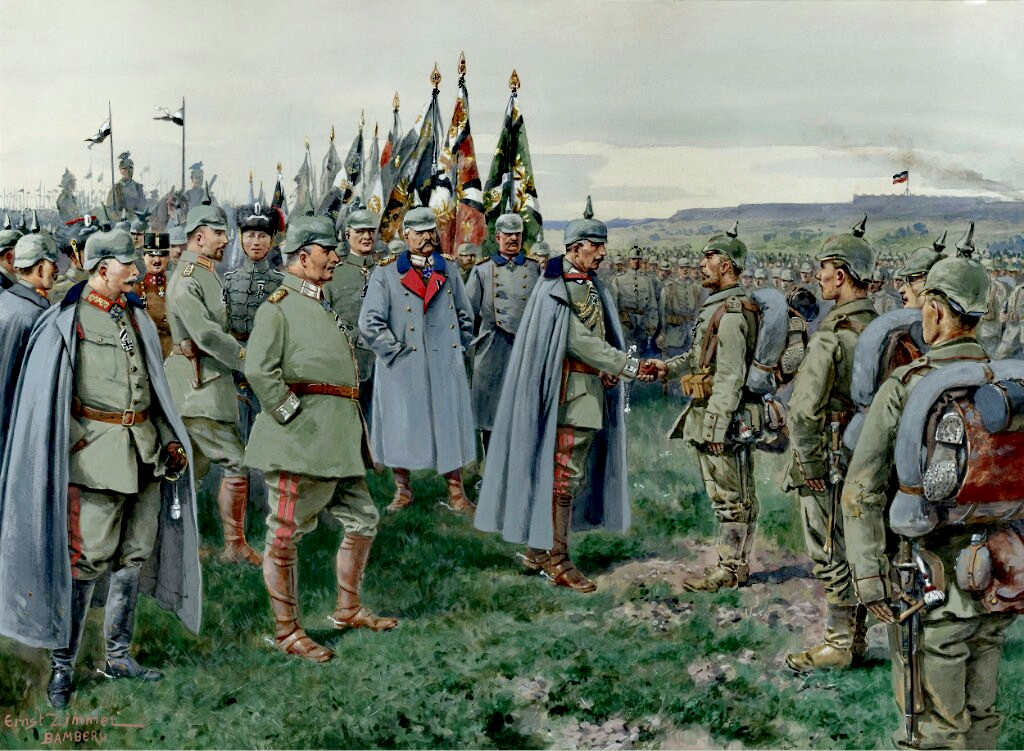
The Emperor presents the Iron Cross to the Heroes of Novogeorgievsk

On August 19 fighting broke out on the second line of forts. Early in the morning forts X, XI and XIV were occupied by the Germans. At Fort II and III, the Russian 249th Infantry Regiment counterattacked Pfeil's Landwehr Brigade; in the midst of the battle, the German field artillery fired all the ammunition and could be captured, but the heavy batteries advanced forward helped repel the onslaught. By 13-00 forts I, II and III were captured by the Germans. Having again moved the heavy batteries forward, the German troops captured the second line of fortifications. The defenders of the fortress on the northern bank of the Vistula had only the citadel and Zakrochim left, the forts on the southern bank were not stormed, the German troops were only approaching them. However, heavy artillery was now shelling the entire space of the citadel, destroying the fortifications. In the evening, large groups of fortress defenders began to raise white flags and surrender, columns of German infantry approached the citadel, communication with the fortress was interrupted. At 2 am on August 20, the commandant of the fortress, cavalry general N. Bobyr, left for negotiations with the commander of the Siege Group X. von Beseler. At 4 o'clock the terms of surrender were signed, an hour later the German artillery ceased fire.

== Russian sources about the surrender of Novogeorgievsk ==
According to the Russian military researcher Alexander Plekhanov:

“In July 1915, the advanced units of General Hans von Beseler reached Novogeorgievsk. Although the general had a low opinion of the Russian army, he was still careful not to storm Novogeorgievsk head-on, since he had only 84 guns, and number of Beseler's troops was almost half that of the garrison of the Russian fortress, although von Beseler had such a trump card as 15 siege mortars with a caliber of 420 and 305 mm, which had already destroyed a number of European fortresses.

As a result of bloody battles, the Germans managed to occupy two forts out of 33 in three days, after which Bobyr fell into hysterics and ordered another 5 forts to be abandoned without a fight, effectively giving the Germans access to the internal defensive line of Novogeorgievsk, which they began to storm. But this was not enough for Bobyr, and on the same day he got into a car with his adjutant and went to surrender to von Beseler’s headquarters. Already in captivity, he scribbled an order for the surrender of the fortress, ordering the entire garrison to lay down their arms. This is what was done: 23 generals, 2,100 officers and more than 80,000 Russian soldiers resignedly went into German captivity.

Never before in the entire history of the Russian Imperial Army have so many generals surrendered at the same time. In terms of the number of prisoners of war, soldiers and officers, von Beseler instantly surpassed the Japanese, who did not take so many prisoners during the entire Russo-Japanese War.

The Germans who occupied the fortress were surprised to find that almost all the guns remained intact, in addition, they received huge reserves of shells, food and ammunition. They then use guns and shells both against the Russian army and against the Anglo-French on the Western Front"

== Regiments of the Russian Imperial Army that surrendered in the Novogeorgievsk fortress ==
58th Infantry Division

229th Infantry Regiment 23 officers, 3438 lower ranks, 3 doctors, 3 clerks
230th Infantry Regiment 30 officers, 3405 lower ranks, 4 doctors, 5 clerks
231st Infantry Regiment 26 officers, 3623 lower ranks, 4 doctors, 4 clerks
232nd Infantry Regiment 34 officers, 3430 lower ranks, 4 doctors, 3 clerks

63rd Infantry Division

249th Infantry Regiment 45 officers, 3657 lower ranks, 3 doctors, 4 clerks
250th Infantry Regiment 56 officers, 1246 lower ranks, 3 doctors, 4 clerks
251st Infantry Regiment 49 officers, 3376 lower ranks, 3 doctors, 3 clerks
252nd Infantry Regiment 48 officers, 3771 lower ranks, 3 doctors, 4 clerks

114th Infantry Division

453rd Infantry Regiment 20 officers, 2817 lower ranks, 3 doctors, 5 clerks
454th Infantry Regiment 22 officers, 2518 lower ranks, 2 doctors, 4 clerks
455th Infantry Regiment 24 officers, 2879 lower ranks, 4 doctors, 7 clerks
456th Infantry Regiment 24 officers, 2657 lower ranks, 5 doctors, 4 clerks

119th Infantry Division

473rd Infantry Regiment 25 officers, 2802 lower ranks, 5 doctors, 6 clerks
474th Infantry Regiment 22 officers, 2844 lower ranks, 5 doctors, 5 clerks
475th Infantry Regiment 21 officers, 2933 lower ranks, 4 doctors, 8 clerks
476th Infantry Regiment 20 officers, 2915 lower ranks, 5 doctors, 6 clerks

== Captured Russian generals ==
The casualties of the Russian Imperial Army in prisoners in Novogeorgievsk were 1.4 times higher than the total casualties in prisoners in the entire Russo-Japanese War of 1904-1905. Of the 23 Russian generals who were captured after the fall of Novogeorgievsk, the names of seventeen are currently known:

- Commandant of the fortress, Cavalry General N. Bobyr
- Commander of the southern part of the fortress, Lieutenant General D. Avranov
- Brigade commander of the 63rd Infantry Division, G. Venevitinov
- Commander of the 231st Infantry Regiment, T. Voloshin-Petrichenko
- Chief of Staff of the fortress, Major General N. Globachev
- Chief of the 58th Infantry Division, Lieutenant General L. de Witt
- Commander of the 2nd Brigade of the 114th Infantry Division, Major General S. Dubrovsky
- Head of the 63rd Infantry Division, Major General V. von Kohlschmidt
- Chief of the 114th Infantry Division G. von Lilienthal
- Brigade commander of the 119th Infantry Division, Major General Prince A. Mamatov
- Chief of the 58th Infantry Division, Major General Y. Ofrosimov
- Head of the 119th Infantry Division, Lieutenant General V. Prasalov
- Commander of the heavy artillery of the fortress, Major General M. Rimsky-Korsakov
- Chief of the 114th Infantry Division, Major General V. Saltykov
- Chief of the Fortress Brigade, Major General M. Khabarov
- Commander of the 58th Infantry Division, Major General P. Chebotarev
- Commander of the 249th Danube Infantry Regiment of the 63rd Infantry Division A. Astashev.

== Outcome ==
The largest fortress of the Russian Empire fell. In the hands of the German Army were 1,500 officers and up to 90,000 soldiers, 1,640 guns, 103 machine guns, 23,219 rifles, 160,000 shells and 7.1 million cartridges. Among the prisoners were 18 (according to other sources 23) generals. German casualties were absolutely insignificant compared to the Russian. About 100 (one hundred) men killed and missing versus 90,000 killed, wounded, missing or captured in the Russian army (the ratio is almost 1 to 1,000).

== Photo Gallery ==
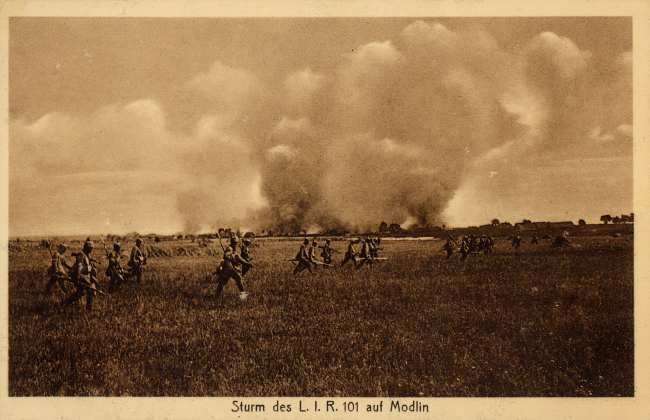
German assault troops.

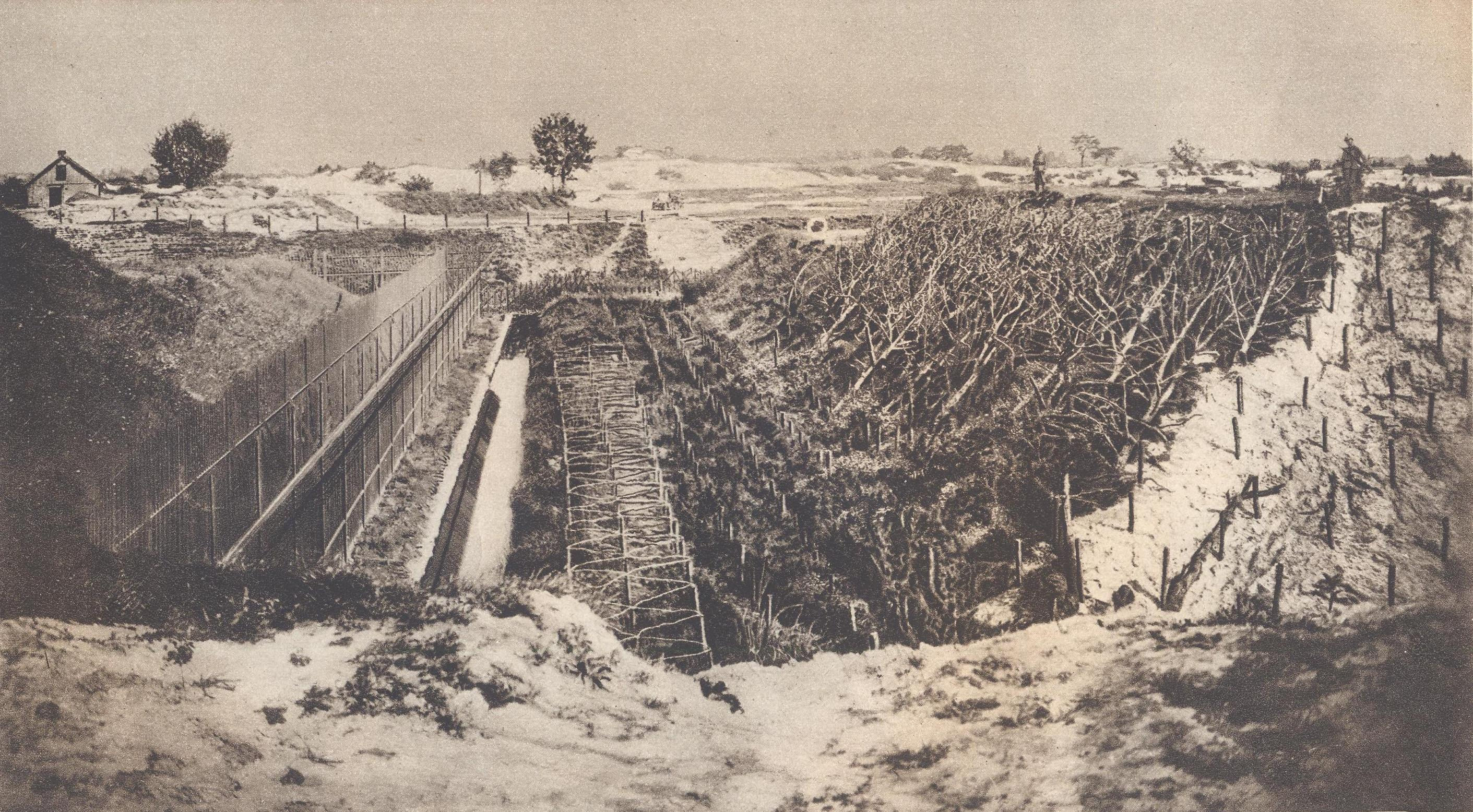
Russian fortifications at Novogeorgievsk.

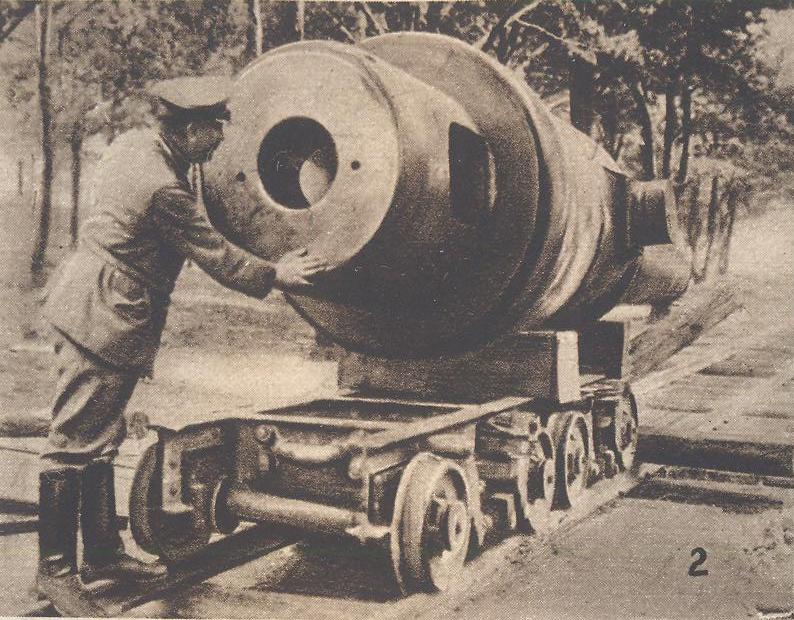
A Russian 11-inch gun captured at Novogeorgievsk.

== See also ==
- Bug–Narew Offensive
