= HNLMS Wassenaar =

HNLMS Wassenaar is the name of the following ships if the Royal Netherlands Navy:

- Dutch ship Wassenaar (1781), a 64-gun ship of the line
- HNLMS Wassenaar (1816), laid down in Amsterdam as the French ship Audacieux, captured with the city in 1813 and wrecked in 1827
- HNLMS Wassenaar (1856), a unique ship in commission 1857–1912
