= Armijn Hemel =

Technology consulting

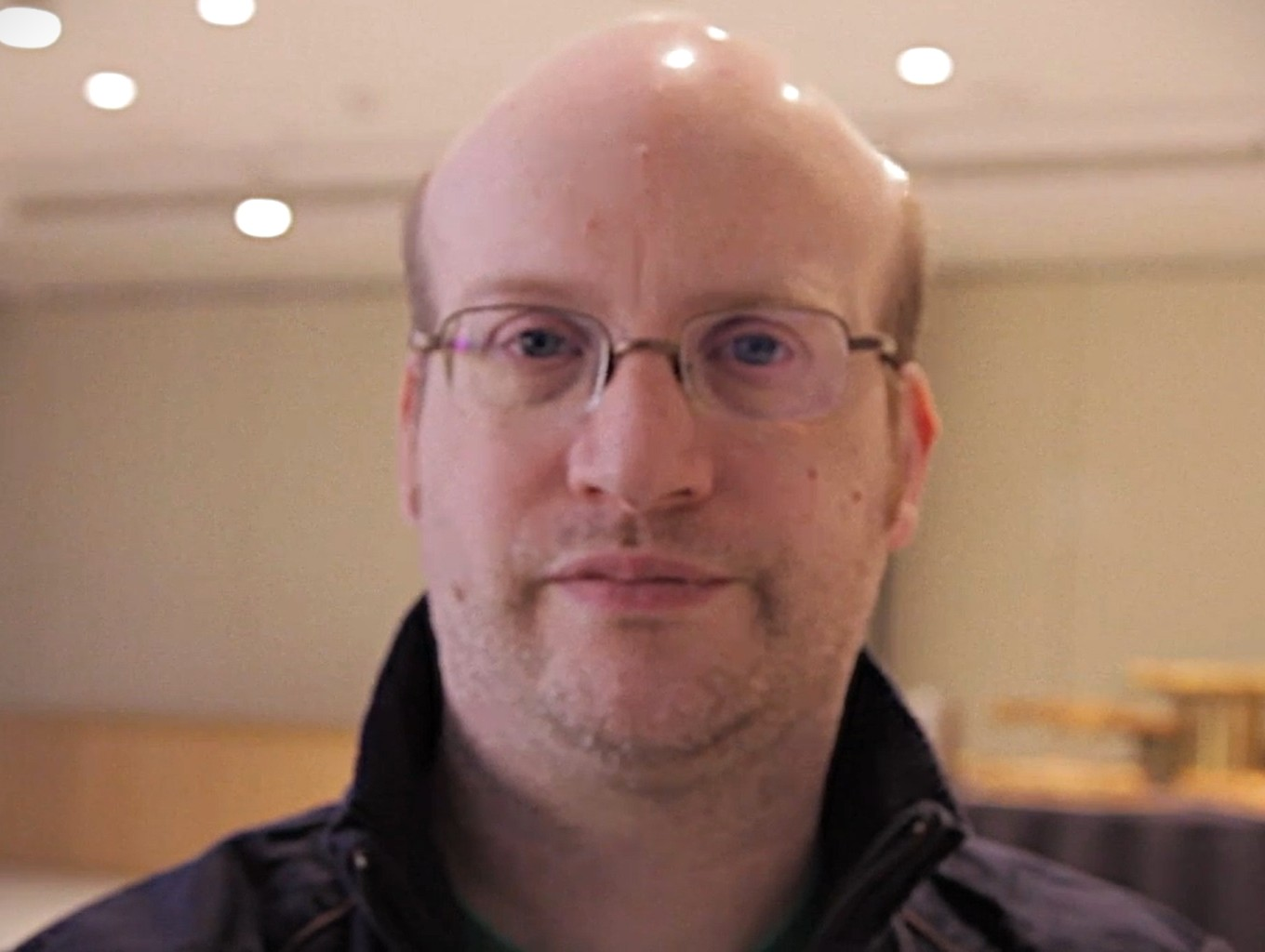
- Hemel in 2017
- Born: late 1970s
- Occupation: Technology consultant
- Organization: gpl-violations.org
- Known for: gpl-violations.org core team; original NixOS prototype

Armijn Hemel is a technology consultant and noted watchman of free software. He is part of the gpl-violations.org core team, who have won several court cases against different companies, including D-Link and Skype, for violating the terms of the GNU General Public License.

== Biography ==
Hemel was born in the late 1970s and grew up in the town of Tiel, Netherlands.

Armijn Hemel created the initial NixOS prototype during his master's degree studies.
