= 58th Infantry Division (Russian Empire) =

Russian Imperial Army formation

- 58-я пехотная дивизия
- Active: 1914–1918
- Country: Russian Empire
- Branch: Russian Imperial Army
- Role: Infantry: World War I; Siege of Novogeorgievsk

The 58th Infantry Division (Russian: 58-я пехотная дивизия, 58-ya Pekhotnaya Diviziya) was an infantry formation of the Russian Imperial Army. The entire division surrendered during the fall of Novogeorgievsk.

== Organization ==
- 1st Brigade
  - 229th Infantry Regiment
  - 230th Infantry Regiment
- 2nd Brigade
  - 231st Infantry Regiment
  - 232nd Infantry Regiment
