= Jagdstaffel 58 =

Jasta 58
- Active: 1918
- Country: Kingdom of Prussia, German Empire
- Branch: Luftstreitkräfte
- Type: Fighter squadron
- Engagements: World War I

Royal Prussian Jagdstaffel 58, commonly abbreviated to Jasta 58, was a "hunting group" (i.e., fighter squadron) of the Luftstreitkräfte, the air arm of the Imperial German Army during World War I. The squadron would score 24 aerial victories during the war, including nine observation balloons downed. The unit's victories came at the expense of five killed in action, two wounded in action, and one injured in an aviation accident.

== History ==
Jasta 58 was founded at the pilots and observers training school at Thorn on 6 January 1918. The new squadron became an operational unit on 20 January. On 24 January 1918, it was posted to 2 Armee. On 1 February 1918, Jasta 58 moved to 17 Armee and joined Jagdgruppe Sud. Jasta 58 flew its first war patrols on 17 February 1918. It moved on to 6 Armee on 2 April 1918. The rookie unit's first aerial victories were scored on 11 April 1918. Two days later, it transferred to 4 Armee. On 6 June 1918, it was consolidated into Emil Thuy's Jagdgruppe 7 with 2 Armee. On 7 July, Jasta 58 was moved again, to 1 Armee. On 19 August 1918, it received its final posting, back to 17 Armee. Jasta 58 served through war's end.

== Commanding officers (Staffelführer) ==
- Hermann Martini: 6 January 1918 – ca 2 April 1918
- Albert Dietlen: ca 2 April 1918 – 12 April 1918 (KIA)
- Leutnant Wendland: 12 April 1918 – 17 April 1918
- Hermann Martini: 17 April 1918 – 10 June 1918
- Leutnant Wendland: 10 June 1918 – 22 June 1918
- Hermann Martini: 22 June 1918 – war's end

== Duty stations ==
- Émerchicourt, France: 24 January 1918
- Aniche, France: March 1918
- Ascq, France: 2 April 1918
- Lomme, France: 11 April 1918 – 13 April 1918
- Koekhoek: 13 April 1918
- Ennemain, France: 6 June 1918
- Neuflize: 9 July 1918
- Aniche: 19 August 1918
- Beuvry, France
- Chievres, Belgium
- Champles
