= 58th Street =

58th Street may refer to:

- 58th (CTA station), a former Chicago "L" station
- 58th Street (Manhattan), street in New York City
- 58th Street (BMT Fifth Avenue Line), a former elevated train station in Brooklyn, New York
- 58th Street station (SEPTA), a SEPTA trolley stop in Philadelphia, Pennsylvania
- 58th Street Terminal (IRT Sixth Avenue Line) a former elevated train station in Manhattan, New York
