= Nix (package manager) =

Purely functional package manager

- Original author: Eelco Dolstra
- Release: June 15, 2003; 23 years ago
- Stable release: 2.35.2 / 13 August 2026; 2 months ago
- Written in: C++, Nix
- Platform: Linux, Darwin, FreeBSD, OpenBSD
- Type: purely functional package manager, free and open-source software, implementation of a programming language, reference implementation, interpreter
- License: GNU Lesser General Public License, version 2.1
- Website: nixos.org
- Repository: github.com/NixOS/nix

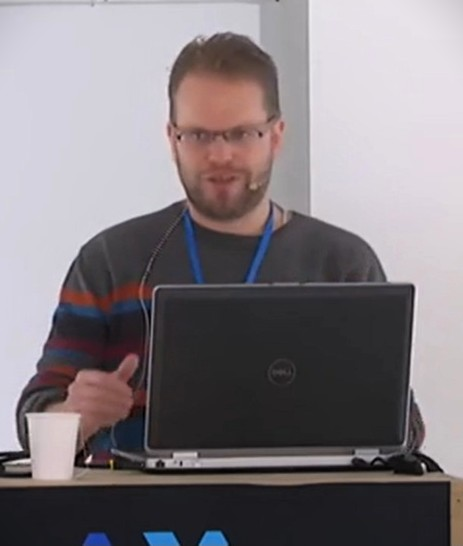
Eelco Dolstra at NixCon 2015

Nix is a cross-platform package manager for Unix and Unix-like systems, with its own functional programming language used to configure those systems. Nix was developed in 2003 by Eelco Dolstra.

== Approach ==
The Nix package manager employs a model in which software packages are each installed into unique directories with immutable contents. These directory names correspond to cryptographic hashes that take into account all dependencies of a package, including other packages managed by Nix. As a result, Nix package names are content-identifying since packages with the same name will have had the same inputs and the same build platform, and therefore the same build result.

== Implementation ==
Package recipes for Nix are written in the purpose-built "Nix language", a declarative, purely functional, lazily evaluated, dynamically typed programming language. Distinguishing features of the Nix language are strings with "context", string interpolation, first-class file system paths, and "indented strings", which in combination allow concisely expressing dependencies between file system data when specifying the contents of new files.

Dependencies between files, as declared in the Nix language, are automatically tracked and persisted in the "Nix store". New files in the Nix store are created through "derivations". A derivation is a persistent data structure that specifies an executable, arguments and environment variables for its invocation (see execve), and other files to be read from the Nix store. The executable is then run in a sandbox that prohibits access to anything but the explicitly specified input files and only allows writing to the designated output path. Nix preserves dependency information in output files by scanning for the distinctive hashes used for package directory names.

Automatic reference tracking ensures integrity of packages, even when they are transferred across machines. It also enables garbage collection of unused packages when no other package depends on them. At the cost of greater storage requirements, all upgrades in Nix are guaranteed to be both atomic and capable of efficient rollback. Unique directory names allow installing many packages with differing versions of shared libraries, and is claimed to eliminate so-called dependency hell. This also lets multiple users safely install software on the same system without administrator privileges. As a result, the Nix package management and deployment model advertises more reliable, reproducible, and portable packages.

Nix has full support for Linux, macOS, and WSL, and can safely be installed side-by-side with another package manager.

=== nixpkgs ===
nixpkgs is the package repository built upon the Nix package manager. According to Repology, as of January 2025 it contains more than 122,000 packages and has a higher number of up-to-date packages than any other package repository. Operating systems supported by Nixpkgs are primarily Linux and Darwin, with some support for Windows and BSD variants. Supported CPU architectures include 64-bit x86 and ARM. Packages for these architectures are built regularly, using a continuous integration service called Hydra, and the results of these builds are uploaded to a public binary cache. When Nix installs a package, it checks this cache and downloads the binary package to avoid building it locally.

nixpkgs is developed in a single Git repository on GitHub. Beside packages, it also contains the source code for NixOS.

== Projects using Nix ==
=== NixOS ===
NixOS is a Linux distribution that uses Nix to declaratively configure and manage the entire system, including the Linux kernel, from as little as one file. Consequently, it is designed for replicability. From one machine's configuration file(s), the user can rebuild whatever aspects of the original machine they desire onto any other machine, producing a new system with the exact same settings, parameters, software, plugins, customization, and more. Similarly, NixOS reposits as many rebuilds of its configuration as the user desires, allowing the user to atomically rollback their system to any previous generation – i.e., one from when their system was stable – as all packages are then restored to the respective versionings installed and/or prescribed when that generation's config was declared.

=== Nix in research and development ===
Nix is used for software packaging and distribution in CERN's LHCb experiment. Nix underlies the distributed software development platforms Replit and Firebase Studio.

== Forks and alternative implementations ==
=== Tvix ===
In 2021, a beta reimplementation by the name Tvix was announced, with the goals of modularity, full compatibility with Nixpkgs, and improved evaluator performance. As of 2024, Tvix has an evaluator and a store implementation, though the authors do not consider the project yet stable or ready for use in production. Tvix is written primarily in Rust.

==== Snix ====
In March 2025 a fork of Tvix, named Snix, was created.

=== Lix ===
In 2024, a team of volunteers released the first version of Lix, a community-made fork of Nix focused on improving compatibility and correcting perceived faults in Nix's design. Lix uses the Meson build automation system, and has been gradually rewriting parts of the code in Rust. Lix was also made to provide a transparent, community-managed alternative to Determinate Nix, a proprietary fork of Nix made in 2022 by the private firm Determinate Software for use in enterprise. The Lix Installer, for instance, is forked from Determinate Nix. Lix is fiscally hosted by the Association Française Nix (French Nix Association / AFNix).

== See also ==
- GNU Guix: another declarative package manager, and early clone of Nix, using GNU Guile for configuration and customization
- Maak: a build automation utility similar to make, and early precursor to Nix
- Runbook automation
