= Lix (readability test) =

Readability measure indicating the difficulty of reading a text

LIX (abbreviation of Swedish läsbarhetsindex, "readibility index") is a readability measure indicating the difficulty of reading a text developed by Swedish scholar Carl-Hugo Björnsson. It is defined as a sum of two numbers: the average sentence length and the percentage of words of more than six letters.

$\text{LIX} = \text{average sentence length} + \text{percentage of words of more than six letters}$

Scores usually range from 20 ("very easy") to 60 ("very difficult").

The exact formula is:

$\text{LIX} = \frac{A}{B} + \frac{C \cdot 100}{A}$, where

$A$ is the number of words,

$B$ is the number of periods (defined by period, colon or capital first letter), and

$C$ is the number of long words (more than 6 letters).
