= 58 Squadron =

58 Squadron or 58th Squadron may refer to:

- No. 58 Squadron RAF, a unit of the Royal Air Force
- 58th Fighter Squadron, a unit of the United States Air Force
- 58th Airlift Squadron, a unit of the United States Air Force
- 58th Strategic Weather Squadron, a unit of the United States Air Force
- 58th Air Transport Squadron, an inactive United States Air Force unit
- 58th Rescue Squadron, a unit of the United States Air Force
- 58th Weather Reconnaissance Squadron, an inactive United States Air Force squadron
- 58 Field Squadron, Royal Engineers, a unit of the British Army
- 58th Squadron, a fictional unit in the television series Space: Above and Beyond

== See also ==
- Jagdstaffel 58, a unit of the Imperial German Army
- 58th Division (disambiguation)
- 58th Regiment (disambiguation)
