= 58th Division =

58th Division or 58th Infantry Division may refer to:

== Infantry divisions ==
- 58th Division (People's Republic of China)
- 58th Infantry Division (German Empire)
- 58th Infantry Division (Wehrmacht), Germany, WWII
- 58th Takavar Division of Shahroud, Iran
- 58th Infantry Division "Legnano", Kingdom of Italy
- 58th Division (Imperial Japanese Army)
- 58th Infantry Division (Russian Empire)
- 58th Guards Rifle Division, Soviet Union
- 58th Motor Rifle Division, Soviet Union
- 58th Rifle Division, Soviet Union
- 58 Division (Sri Lanka)
- 58th (2/1st London) Division, United Kingdom

== Aviation divisions ==
- 58th Air Division, United States

== See also ==
- List of military divisions by number
- 58th Brigade (disambiguation)
- 58th Regiment (disambiguation)
- 58th Squadron (disambiguation)
