= Eelco Wassenaar =

American field hockey player

Eelco Wassenaar (born December 14, 1973) is an American former field hockey player who competed in the 1996 Summer Olympics.
