= 58th Brigade =

58th Brigade or 58th Infantry Brigade may refer to:

== China ==
- 58th Mechanized Infantry Brigade (People's Republic of China)

== India ==
- 58th Indian Brigade of the British Indian Army in the First World War

== Iran ==
- 58th Brigade (Iran)

== Ukraine ==
- 58th Motorized Brigade of the Ukrainian Ground Forces

== United Kingdom ==
- 58th Anti-Aircraft Brigade
- 58th Brigade (United Kingdom)

=== Artillery units ===
- 58th Brigade, Royal Field Artillery, of the British Army in the First World War
- 58th (Home Counties) Brigade, Royal Field Artillery, of the British Army after the First World War
- 58th Divisional Trench Mortar Brigade of the British Army in the First World War

== United States ==
- 58th Expeditionary Military Intelligence Brigade

== See also ==
- 58th Division (disambiguation)
- 58th Regiment (disambiguation)
