= 58th Regiment =

58th Regiment or 58th Infantry Regiment may refer to:

- 58th Regiment of Foot (disambiguation), three British Army units have carried this name
- 58th (Middlesex) Searchlight Regiment, Royal Artillery, a British Army unit, 1938–1955
- 58th Vaughan's Rifles (Frontier Force), a unit of the British Indian Army
- 58th Infantry Regiment (United States), most recent 58th Infantry in the United States Army

American Civil War

Union (Northern) Army

- 58th Pennsylvania Infantry
- 58th Illinois Volunteer Infantry Regiment
- 58th Indiana Infantry Regiment

Confederate (Southern) Army

- 58th Regiment Alabama Infantry
- 58th Virginia Infantry
