= Moksha (window manager) =

Window manager

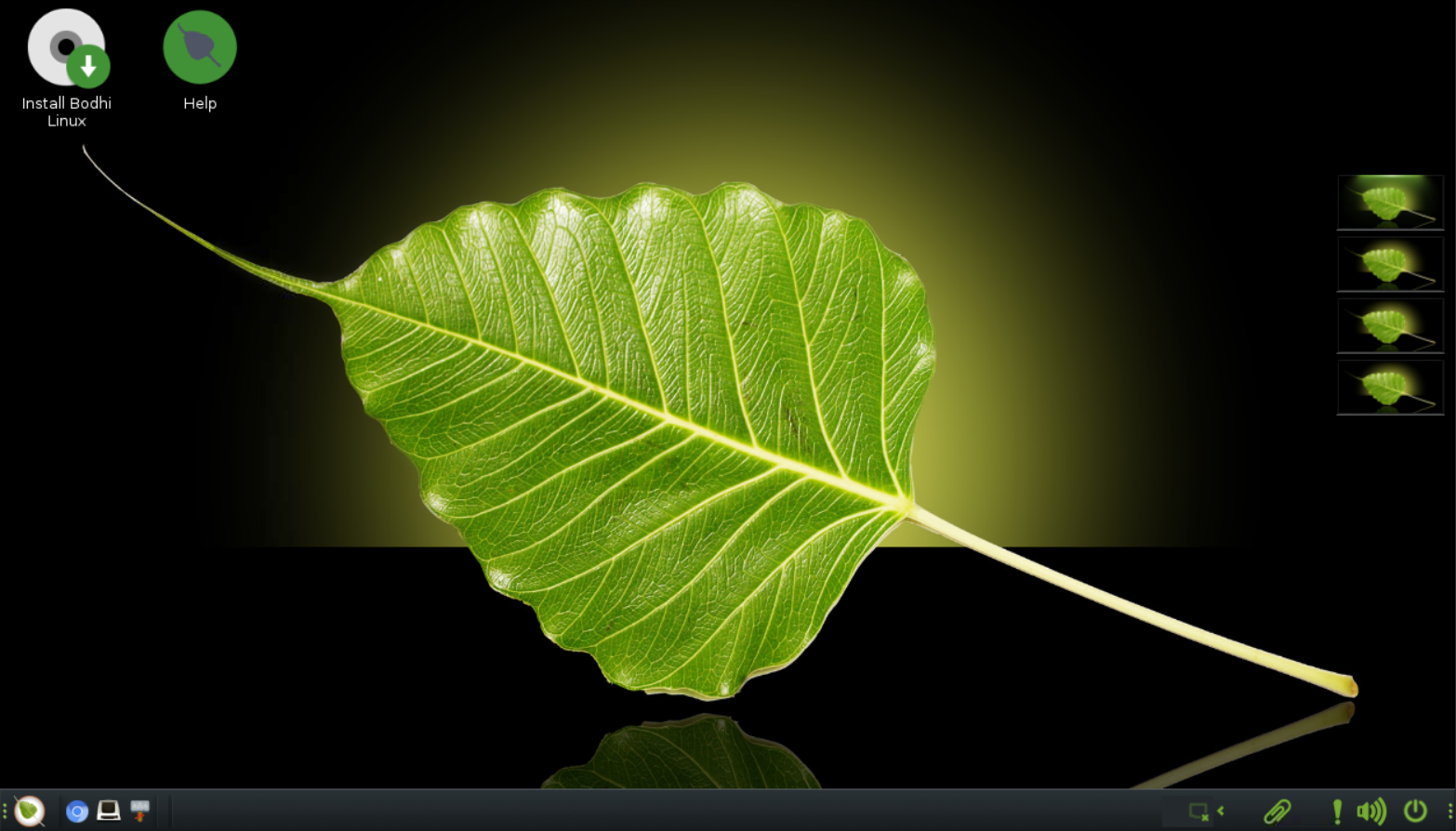
- Screenshot of Moksha window manager on Bodhi Linux 7.0.0
- Other names: Moksha Desktop
- Initial release: August 11, 2015; 10 years ago
- Stable release: 0.4.1 / 28 August 2023; 2 years ago
- Written in: C
- Operating system: Linux
- Included with: Bodhi Linux
- Type: Window manager
- License: BSD 2-clause license
- Website: www.bodhilinux.com/moksha-desktop/
- Repository: github.com/JeffHoogland/moksha

Moksha is an open source window manager for Linux used primarily by Bodhi Linux. It is a fork and continuation of the Enlightenment 17 window manager.

== History ==
Moksha was created by the Bodhi Linux developers as a continuation and improvement of the Enlightenment 17 window manager after the developers had trouble with Enlightenment 18 and 19. Previous versions of Bodhi Linux had used Enlightenment 17, before skipping 18 entirely and using 19. The first version of Bodhi Linux to contain Moksha was version 3.1.0 released on 11 August 2015.

== About ==
Moksha is a window manager designed to have most of the functionalities of a desktop environment, while being lightweight and customizable. The appearance was made to resemble the classic Windows design. It consists of a window manager with customizable applets and modules. Features offered by default include a panel with a start menu, an application switcher, system controls, a clock, and a virtual desktop feature. Customization options are centered around gadgets, which consist of modules, and launchers within shelves. Themes are also available.
