= Enlightenment (window manager) =

Compositing window manager

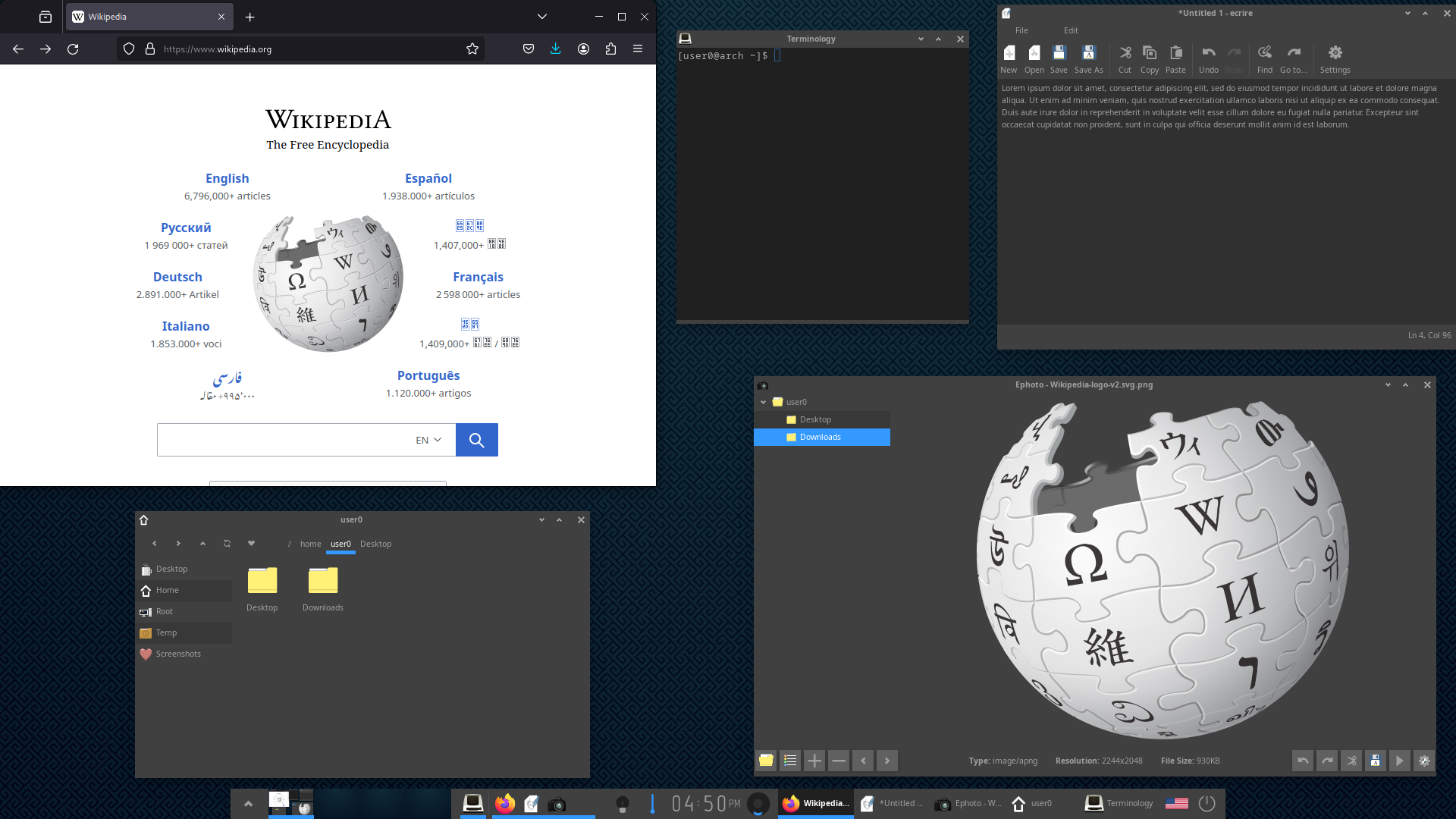
- Enlightenment 0.26.0
- Original author: Carsten Haitzler
- Developer: Enlightenment development team
- Release: 1997; 29 years ago
- Stable release: 0.28.0 / 31 October 2026; 3 days ago
- Written in: C (EFL)
- Operating system: Unix-like
- Type: Window manager; Graphical shell; Desktop environment
- License: BSD 2-Clause
- Website: www.enlightenment.org
- Repository: git.enlightenment.org

Enlightenment, also known simply as E, is a compositing window manager for the X Window System. Since version 0.20, Enlightenment also supports Wayland. It is shipped with some Linux distributions such as Bodhi Linux and Pentoo.

Despite being a window manager, Enlightenment comes with many modules that build it up to a full desktop desktop environment. Since version 0.17 (E17), Enlightenment is written with the Enlightenment Foundation Libraries (EFL), and the Enlightenment project writes a set of applications with the toolkit.

== History ==
=== E16 and before ===
The first version of Enlightenment was released by Carsten Haitzler in 1997. Originally, it was just a window manager before the addition of the EFL in E17.

With the release of E17 written with the EFL in 2012, Enlightenment went through a major rewrite, splitting the codebase into 0.16 (E16) and the versions after (E17). Some of the community decided to stay with the E16 codebase and continue development of this version, releasing under an independent versioning scheme from E17. It reached the 1.0 milestone and is still actively developed as of 2026.

=== E17 and later ===
In 2000, the development of the Enlightenment Foundation Libraries started to create a toolkit for writing applications that interoperate with Enlightenment, as well as other X window managers, too. As the EFL was built up, Enlightenment was rewritten to utilize the EFL, and in 2012 version 0.17.0 was released. As this version was completely rewritten to use the EFL, it is incompatible with E16.

The current version as of October 2026 is 0.28.0.

== Usage ==
Bodhi Linux was built around the Enlightenment 17 desktop, but forked it to create the Moksha desktop.

Elive Linux also used a fork of E17 as its main desktop environment until 2019, when the 3.7 series was released. It also features E16 and the new E27 version.

== Reception ==
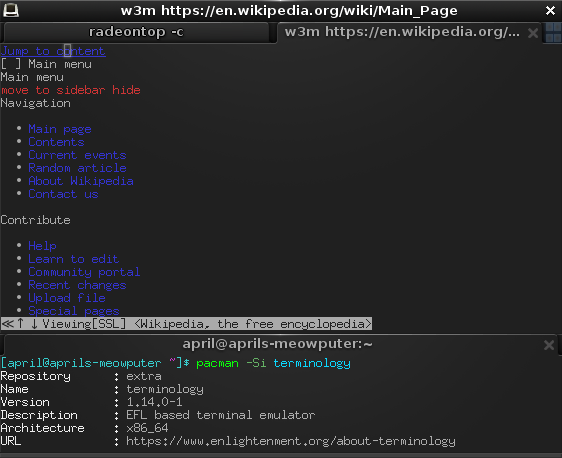
Terminology 1.14.0

A 2011 review of E16 found it was highly customizable, featuring per-window configurability, support for virtual desktops with much larger screenspace than monitor size, and that "nearly everything can be done with the keyboard." While the appearance was praised, the desktop environment was criticized as being somewhat unstable due to bugs at the time. While E16 could be used as a window manager for GNOME or KDE, the review found they had poor compatibility.

A 2014 review of E17 found the design to be fast, touchscreen friendly and have a nice appearance, but was annoyed by the small selection area to resize windows. The appearance of the default terminal with the desktop environment, called Terminology, was also praised and the author personally liked the desktop left and right click menus.

A 2017 review found E18 to have lightweight performance, remarking a similar appearance to Mac OS, but also mentioning a steep learning curve due to the desktop left and right click menus.

A 2020 review praised Enlightenment for its high number of keyboard shortcuts, and that it was lightweight enough to run well on older hardware, with low idle CPU and RAM usage. However, it criticized the desktop left and right click menus for having too much complexity.

== Release history ==
Major releases
Version	Code name	Release date	Notes
pre-alpha	Enlightenment Alpha1	October 1996	
0.13.2	DR13	18 January 1998	
0.14.0	DR14	18 July 1998	
0.15.0	DR15	12 March 1999	
0.16	DR16	10 October 1999	Still maintained as of 2024. Preferred by many people, especially as a "retro" desktop.
0.17	DR17	21 December 2012	Major rewrite version. Was forked to create the Moksha desktop.
0.18	DR18	22 December 2013	
0.19	DR19	15 September 2014	
0.20	DR20	1 December 2015	
0.21	DR21	1 June 2016	
0.22	DR22	22 November 2017	
0.23	DR 0.23	24 August 2019	
0.24	DR 0.24	17 May 2020	
0.25	DR 0.25	16 December 2021	
0.26	DR 0.26	23 December 2023	
0.27	DR 0.27	11 January 2025	
0.28	DR 0.28	31 October 2026	Current release. Added NetBSD support.

== See also ==
- Entrance (display manager)
- Comparison of X window managers
