= Carsten Haitzler =

Australian-German software engineer

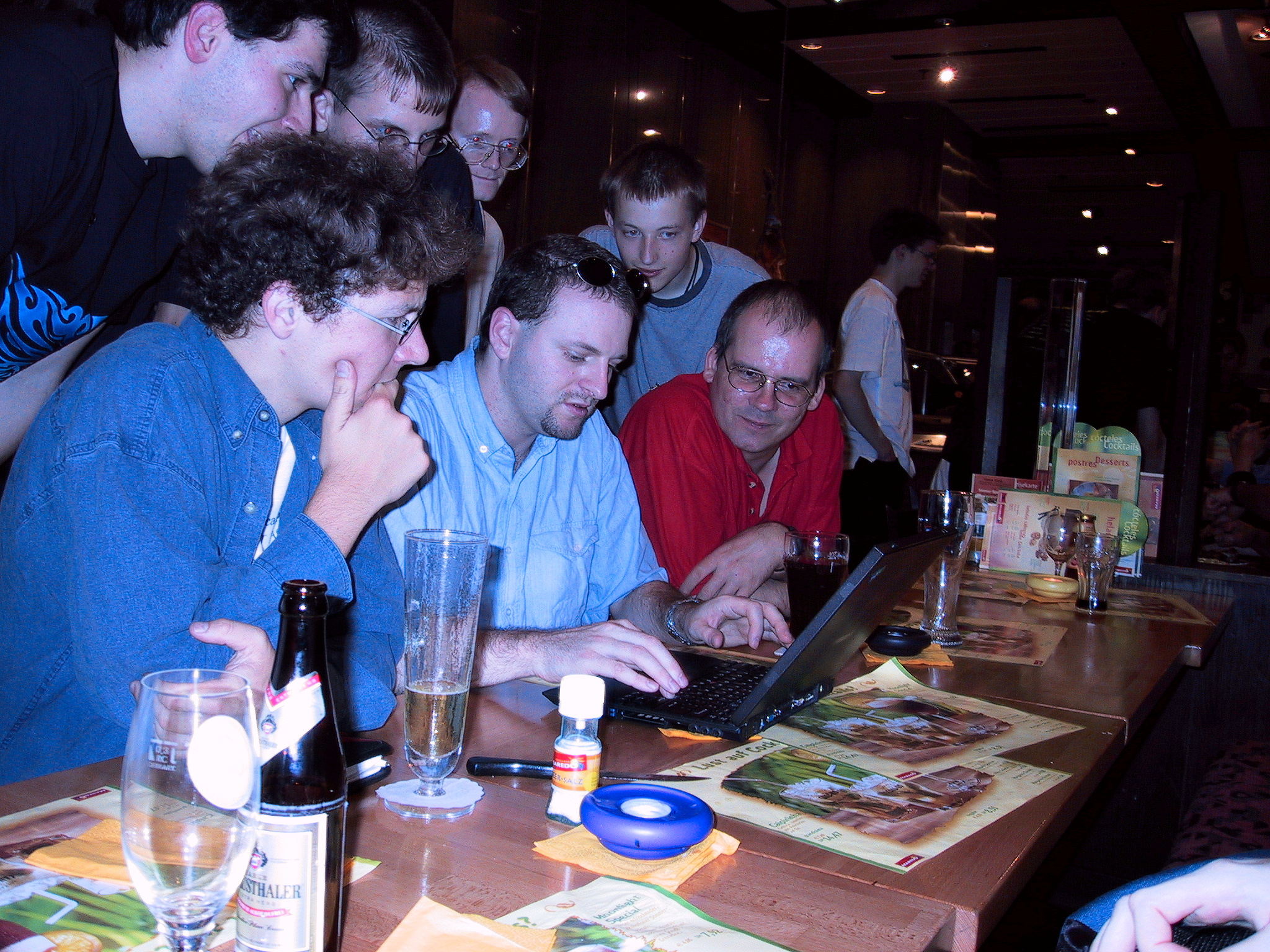
- Carsten Haitzler in light blue shirt, centre
- Born: Nigeria
- Education: University of New South Wales
- Occupation: Software engineer
- Website: www.rasterman.com

Carsten Haitzler (born 1975), known as Raster or Rasterman to the open source community, is an Australian-German software engineer, best known for initiating and leading the development of the Enlightenment window manager and its libraries.

== Life and work ==
In 1997 Haitzler moved to North Carolina, U.S. to work for Red Hat in the development of the CORBA, Xlib, GTK+ libraries, then later moved to work with VA Linux Systems.

Between 2010 and 2018 he worked on Samsung's Linux platform Tizen.
