= UKUI =

Linux desktop environment

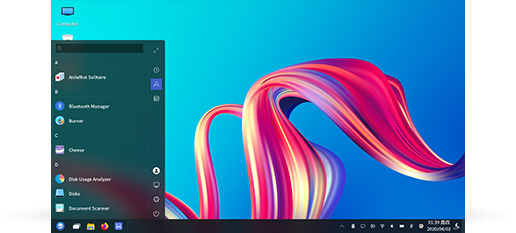
- Developers: National University of Defense Technology, Canonical Ltd., KylinSoft
- Stable release: 4.0 / 2023; 3 years ago
- Written in: C/C++ (Qt)
- Website: www.ukui.org
- Repository: https://github.com/ukui/ukui-desktop-environment

UKUI (Ultimate Kylin User Interface) is a desktop environment for Linux distributions and other UNIX-like operating systems, originally developed for Ubuntu Kylin, and written using the Qt framework. UKUI was a fork of the MATE Desktop Environment.

UKUI is a lightweight desktop environment, which consumes few resources and works with older computers. It has been developed with GTK and Qt technologies. Its visual appearance is similar to Windows 7, making it easier for new users of Linux.

== Gallery ==
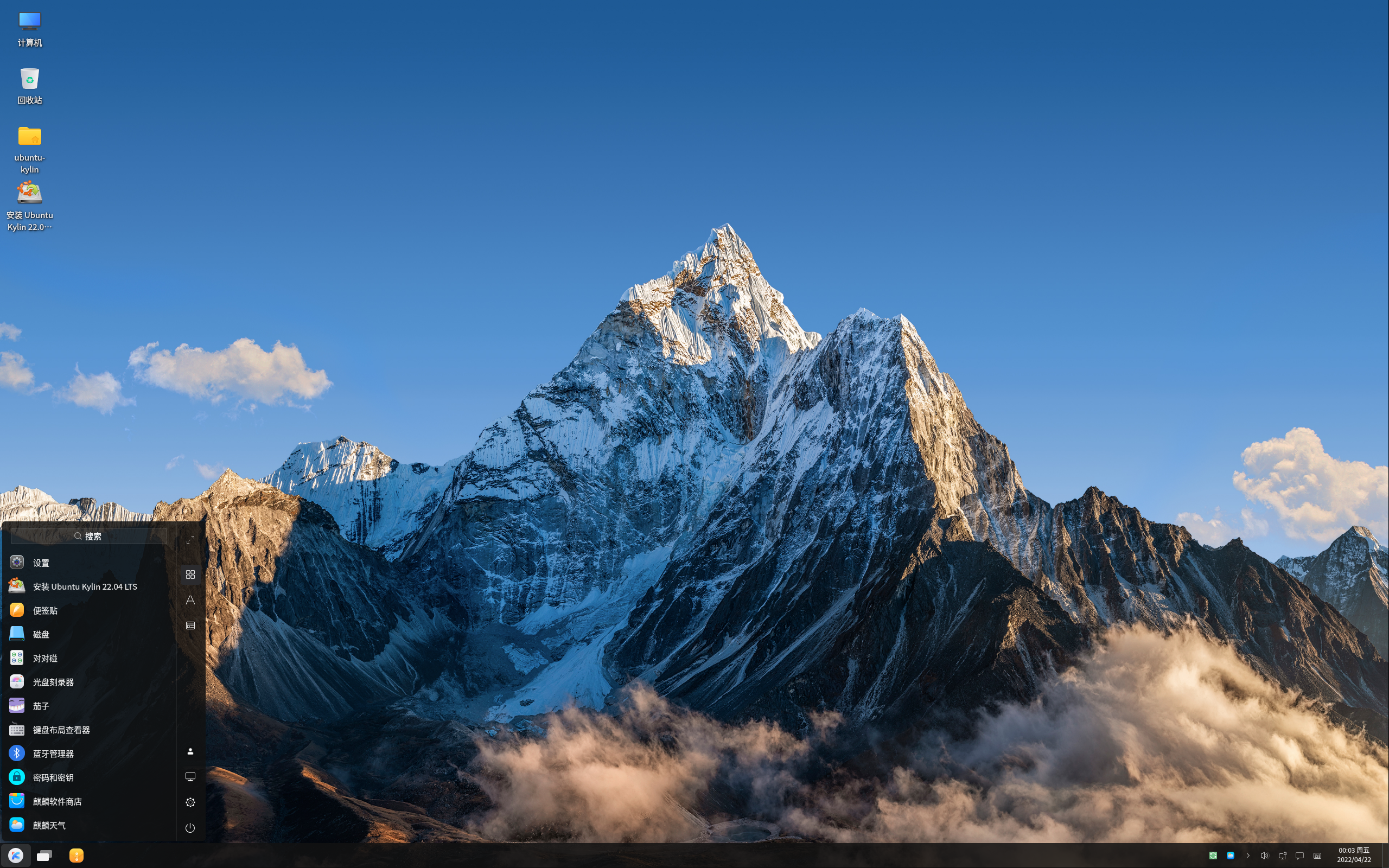

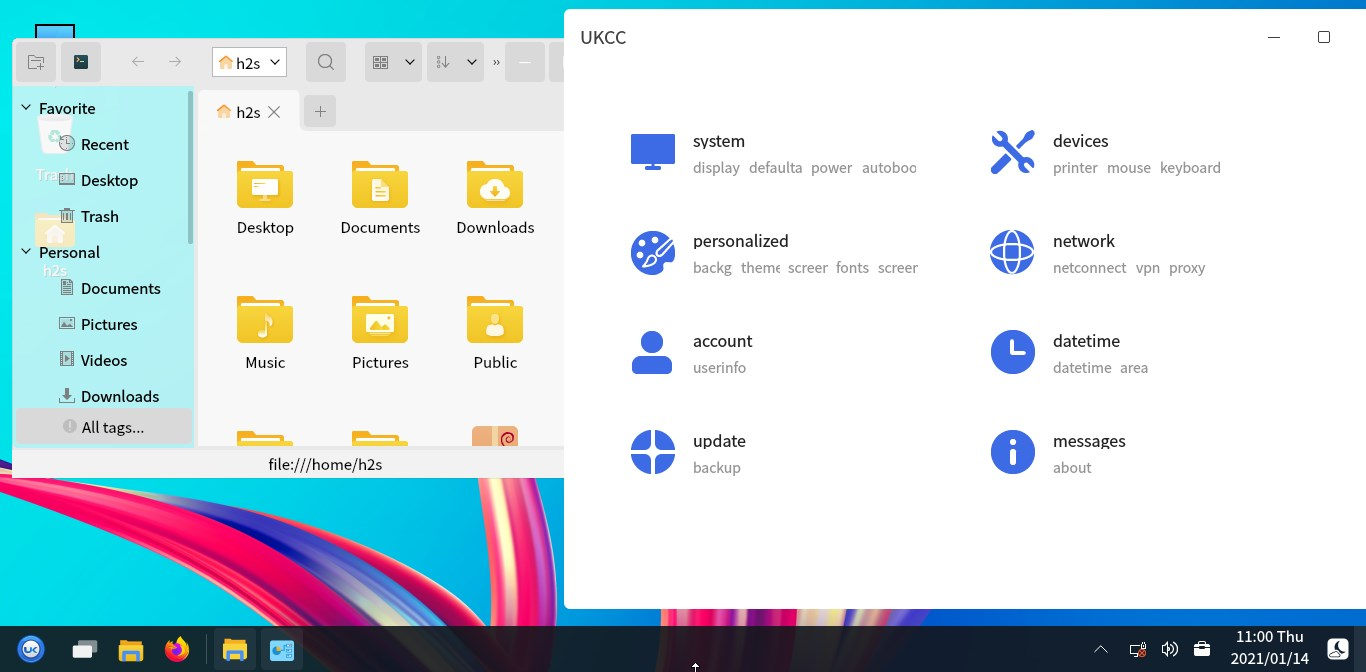
White-theme
