= Xito =

- Repository: svn.code.sf.net/p/xito/code/
- Written in: Java
- License: Apache license 2.0
- Website: xito.sourceforge.net

Xito is a Java based portable desktop environment. It claims to be committed to creating and developing an open-source desktop that will "introduce a new level of functionality and usability to internet based software applications." Since Java has large performance and space requirements the Xito desktop environment is currently trying to address these problems.

== See also ==
- Yahoo! Widget Engine
