= Bodhi Linux =

Linux distribution

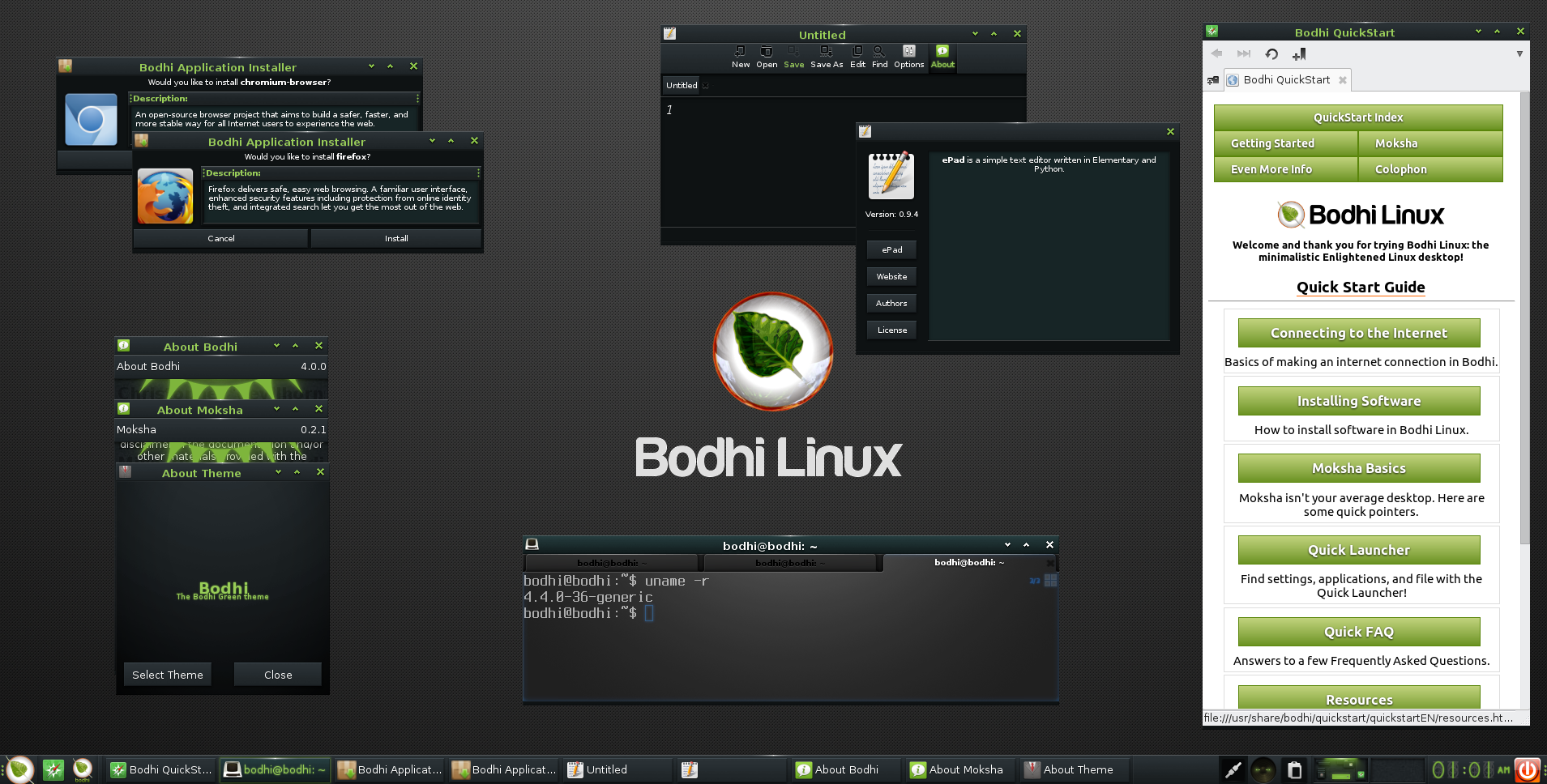
- Bodhi Linux 5.1.0
- Developer: Bodhi Linux Team
- OS family: Unix-like (Linux kernel)
- Working state: Current
- Source model: Open source
- Initial release: 26 March 2011; 15 years ago
- Latest release: 7.0.0 / 21 August 2023; 3 years ago
- Update method: APT (front-ends available)
- Package manager: dpkg (front-ends like Synaptic available)
- Supported platforms: IA-32, x86-64
- Kernel type: Monolithic (Linux kernel)
- Userland: GNU
- Default user interface: Moksha (based on Enlightenment)
- License: Free software licenses (mainly GPL), plus proprietary binary blobs
- Official website: bodhilinux.com

Bodhi Linux is a light-weight Linux distribution based on Ubuntu that uses an Enlightenment DR17-based fork called Moksha as its desktop environment. The philosophy for the distribution is to provide a minimal base system so that users can install the software they want. In turn, the distribution only includes software that is essential to most users, such as a file manager (Thunar), a terminal emulator (Terminology), and a web browser. To install additional software, Bodhi Linux developers maintain a browser-based app store that uses apturl to install programs.

== Performance ==
System requirements include 512MB RAM, 5GB hard disk space, and a 500MHz processor. 32-bit processors without PAE capability are supported on the same terms as PAE-enabled ones. The only difference between the two Bodhi versions is that an older kernel is used.

=== Moksha Desktop ===
Using an Enlightenment DR17-based fork called Moksha Desktop, Bodhi provides desktop effects and animations that do not require high-end computer hardware. The project was forked from DR17 since later versions of Enlightenment had performance and stability issues. The Enlightenment window manager, as well as the tools developed specifically for Bodhi Linux, were written in the C programming language and Python.

== Support ==
Bodhi Linux is derived from Ubuntu long term support releases (14.04, 16.04, 18.04...), so support follows the same pattern: Security bug fixes are released daily throughout the five years. As opposed to Ubuntu, Bodhi has no short-term support release. An installed Bodhi Linux can be upgraded to the latest state via the command line or package manager.

== Releases ==
The major releases follow the Ubuntu long-term support(LTS), with a delay of a few months. The goal is to deliver a new major release in July every other year. The update/point releases (x.y.z) are used for delivering new versions and other improvements. Beginning with version 2.4.0 update frequency was reduced to three times a year.

Historical releases

Version	Release date	Comments	Supported until
0.1.6	2011-02	First version of Bodhi Linux	unsupported
0.1.7	2011-03		unsupported
1.0.0	2011-03		unsupported
1.1.0	2011-05		unsupported
1.2.0	2011-09		unsupported
1.2.1	2011-10		unsupported
1.3.0	2011–12		unsupported
1.4.0	2012-03	—N/a	unsupported
1.5.0	2012-06	Last update release to the 10.04 base	unsupported
2.0.0	2012-07	First stable release to the 12.04 base	2017-04
2.1.0	2012-09	Update release (3-month cycle)	2017-04
2.2.0	2012-12	Update release	2017-04
2.3.0	2013-03	Update release	2017-04
2.4.0	2013-09	Last update release to 12.04 base	2017-04
3.0.0	2015-02	First stable release to the 14.04 base	2019-04
3.1.0	2015-08	Update release first to feature the Moksha Desktop Environment	2019-04
3.2.0	2016-03	Update release	2019-04
4.0.0	2016-10	First stable release to the 16.04 base	2021-04
4.1.0	2017-01	Update release	2021-04
4.2.0	2017-05	Update release	2021-04
4.3.0	2017-08	Update release	2021-04
4.4.0	2017-12	Update release	2021-04
4.5.0	2018-02	Update release	2021-04
5.0.0	2018-08	Based on Ubuntu 18.04	2023-04
5.1.0	2020-03	Based on Ubuntu 18.04.04	2023-04
Unsupported Supported Latest version Future version

Currently supported releases

Version	Release date	Comments	Supported until
6.0.0	2021-05	Based on Ubuntu 20.04.2	2025-04
7.0.0	2023-08	Based on Ubuntu 22.04	2027-04
Unsupported Supported Latest version Future version

== R_Pi Bodhi Linux ==
The R_Pi Bodhi Linux build was built directly on top of Raspbian and incorporates all of the changes and improvements to produce optimized "hard float" code for the Raspberry Pi (armhf or ARM HF). Technically, R_Pi Bodhi Linux is built with compilation settings adjusted to produce optimized "hard float" code for the Raspberry Pi (armhf or ARM HF). The hard float application binary interface of the ARM11, a 32-bit RISC microprocessor ARM architecture with ARMv6 architectural additions, provides enormous performance gains for many use cases. However, this requires significant effort to port elements of Debian Wheezy to be comparable with ARMv6 CPUs, as official builds require ARMv7.

== See also ==
- Enlightenment Foundation Libraries
- Enlightenment (window manager)
- Minimalism (computing)
