= Elive =

Linux distribution developed by Samuel F. Baggen

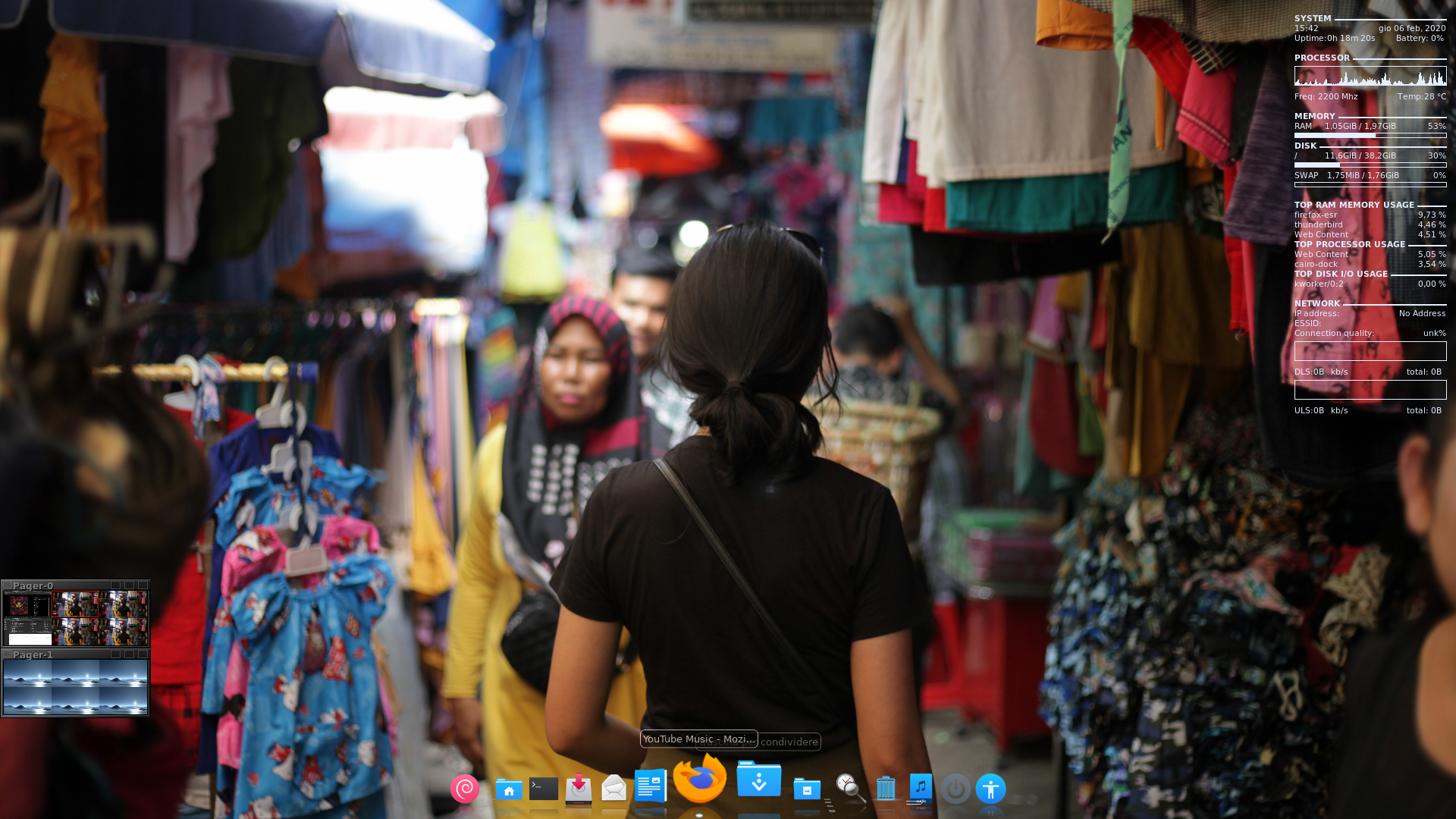
- Screenshot of a customised Elive Beta using E16
- Developer: Samuel F. Baggen
- OS family: Linux (Unix-like)
- Working state: Current
- Source model: Open source
- Initial release: January 2005; 21 years ago
- Latest release: 3.8.48
- Repository: https://github.com/Elive
- Available in: 75 languages
- Package manager: apt
- Supported platforms: i386, AMD64
- Kernel type: Monolithic (Linux kernel)
- Influenced by: Knoppix
- Default user interface: Enlightenment
- License: Various
- Official website: https://www.elivecd.org/

Elive is a non-commercial Linux distribution based on Debian. It uses the Enlightenment desktop environment, offering a live DVD and a persistent USB image for 32- and 64-bit computers with Intel or AMD x86 processors.

== History ==
Elive was established in early 2005 as a customized Knoppix Live DVD running the Enlightenment desktop. The first version to appear publicly was called Elive and referenced multiple times by DistroWatch's Ladislav Bodnar and Susan Linton. It was also distributed by UK-based LinuxFormat magazine in 2007, as well as being offered on their cover-disc.

In July 2007, Susan Linton wrote for Distrowatch, "I love Elive and version 1.0 is a wonderful first full release. Just about everything works and works well." At the time, the review was somewhat mixed, with certain criticisms pertaining to laptop usage, such as (at that time) lack of CPU throttling, or WEP when connecting to WiFi.

=== Controversy regarding payment model ===
In 2010, version 2.0 was released with improvements like upgrade mode, the "nurse" and more. Linux Magazine and Linux Journal especially touted the tight integration of the E17 window manager in their reviews. However, this version required payment for installation to hard disk which seriously impacted the initial popularity and was subsequently changed to a voluntary donation. A March 2010 article by Koen Vervloesem of LWN.net criticized Elive 2.0 for requiring payment partway through installation to a hard drive.

Eight years after 2.0, version 3.0 was released. Elive was no longer pay-to-install, but its prolonged development cycle and certain other factors led to mixed reviews of the project.

== Releases ==
Three separate versions are currently available, as of 1 July 2023:

- Stable (version 3.0.6), based on Debian Wheezy and E17. It has a 32-bit release only.
- Beta (now at version 3.8.30), which offers a 32- and 64-bit release. It is based on Debian Bullseye and uses the E16 desktop environment.
- Retrowave Stable based on 3.8.32 Beta

== Related pages ==
- List of Linux distributions
- Enlightenment (window manager)

== See also ==
- Comparison of Linux distributions
