= Desktop environment =

Implementation of graphical user interface

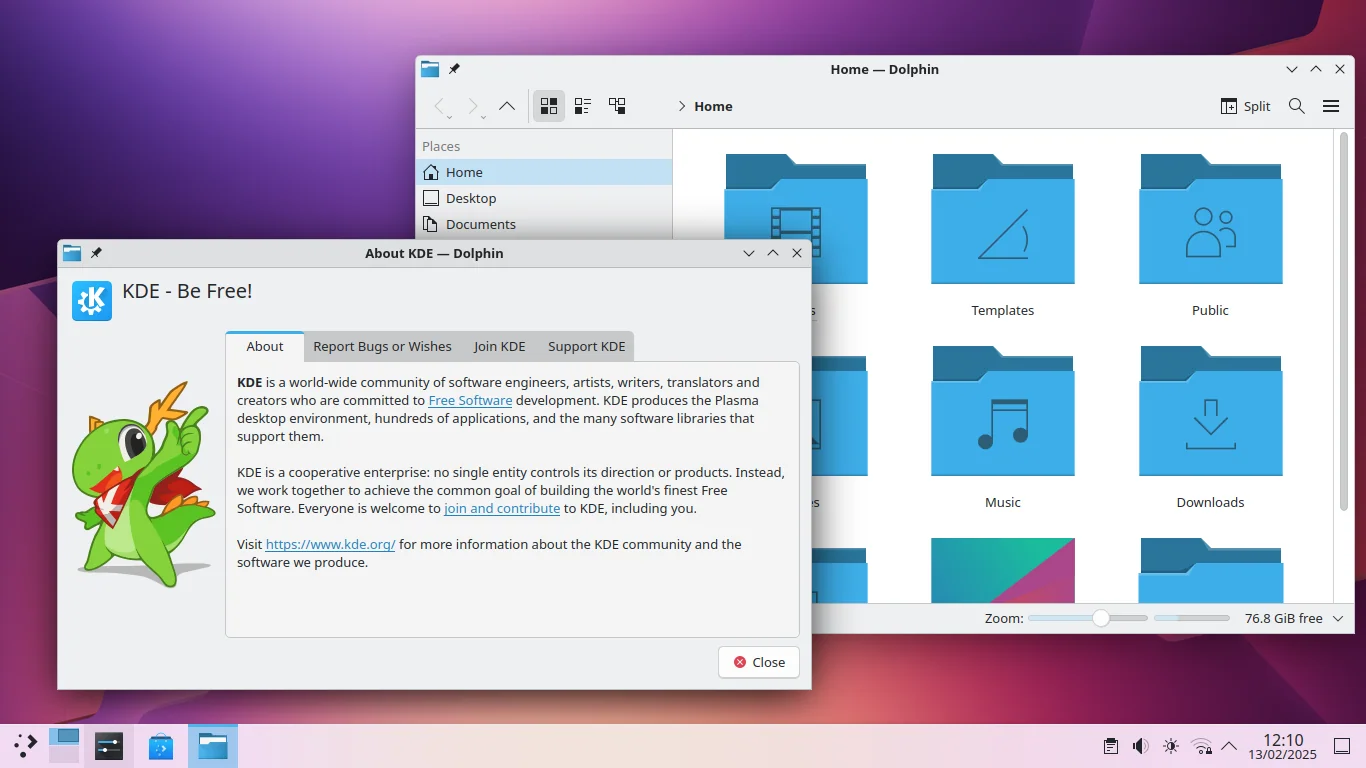
The Plasma desktop environment by KDE, showing the Dolphin file manager and About KDE

In computing, a desktop environment (DE) is an implementation of the desktop metaphor made of a bundle of programs running on top of a computer operating system that share a common graphical user interface (GUI), sometimes described as a graphical shell. The desktop environment was seen mostly on personal computers until the rise of mobile computing. Desktop GUIs help the user to easily access and edit files, while they usually do not provide access to all of the features found in the underlying operating system. Instead, the traditional command-line interface (CLI) is still used when full control over the operating system is required.

A desktop environment typically consists of icons, windows, toolbars, folders, wallpapers and desktop widgets (see Elements of graphical user interfaces and WIMP). A GUI might also provide drag and drop functionality and other features that make the desktop metaphor more complete. A desktop environment aims to be an intuitive way for the user to interact with the computer using concepts which are similar to those used when interacting with the physical world, such as buttons and windows.

While the term desktop environment originally described a style of user interfaces following the desktop metaphor, it has also come to describe the programs that realize the metaphor itself. This usage has been popularized by projects such as the Common Desktop Environment, KDE, and GNOME.

== Implementation ==
On a system that offers a desktop environment, a window manager in conjunction with applications written using a widget toolkit are generally responsible for most of what the user sees. The window manager supports the user interactions with the environment, while the toolkit provides developers a software library for applications with a unified look and behavior.

A windowing system of some sort generally interfaces directly with the underlying operating system and libraries. This provides support for graphical hardware, pointing devices, and keyboards. The window manager generally runs on top of this windowing system. While the windowing system may provide some window management functionality, this functionality is still considered to be part of the window manager, which simply happens to have been provided by the windowing system.

Applications that are created with a particular window manager in mind usually make use of a windowing toolkit, generally provided with the operating system or window manager. A windowing toolkit gives applications access to widgets that allow the user to interact graphically with the application in a consistent way.

== History and common use ==
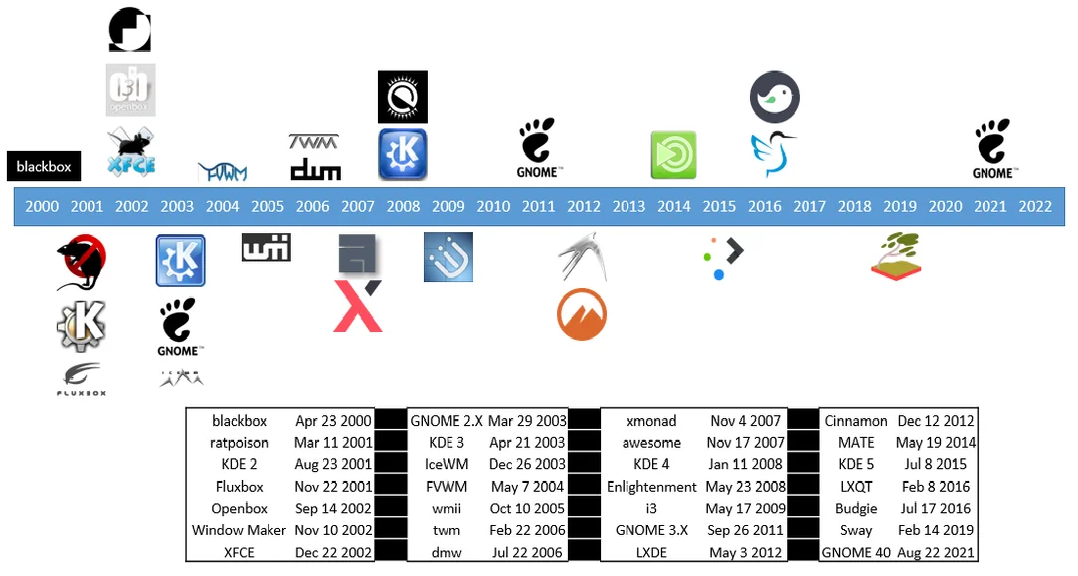
Timeline of desktop environment since 2000

The first desktop environment was created by Xerox and was sold with the Xerox Alto in the 1970s. The Alto was generally considered by Xerox to be a personal office computer; it failed in the marketplace because of poor marketing and a very high price tag. With the Lisa, Apple introduced a desktop environment on an affordable personal computer, which also failed in the market.

The desktop metaphor was popularized on commercial personal computers by the original Macintosh from Apple in 1984, and was popularized further by Windows from Microsoft since the 1990s. As of 2014, the most popular desktop environments are descendants of these earlier environments, including the Windows shell used in Microsoft Windows, and the Aqua environment used in macOS. When compared with the X-based desktop environments available for Unix-like operating systems such as Linux and BSD, the proprietary desktop environments included with Windows and macOS have relatively fixed layouts and static features, with highly integrated "seamless" designs that aim to provide mostly consistent customer experiences across installations.

Microsoft Windows dominates in marketshare among personal computers with a desktop environment. Computers using Unix-like operating systems such as macOS, ChromeOS, Linux, BSD or Solaris are much less common; however, as of 2015 there is a growing market for low-cost Linux PCs using the X Window System or Wayland with a broad choice of desktop environments. Among the more popular of these are Google's Chromebooks and Chromeboxes, Intel's NUC, the Raspberry Pi, etc.

On tablets and smartphones, the situation is the opposite, with Unix-like operating systems dominating the market, including iOS (BSD-derived), Android, Tizen, Sailfish and Ubuntu (all Linux-derived). Microsoft's Windows phone, Windows RT and Windows 10 are used on a much smaller number of tablets and smartphones. However, the majority of Unix-like operating systems dominant on handheld devices do not use the X11 desktop environments used by other Unix-like operating systems, relying instead on interfaces based on other technologies.

== Desktop environments for the X Window System ==
A brief timeline of the most popular modern desktop environments for Unix-like operating systems (Greyscale logos indicate when the project's development started, while colorized logos indicate the project's first official release.)

On systems running the X Window System (typically Unix-family systems such as Linux, the BSDs, and formal UNIX distributions), desktop environments are much more dynamic and customizable to meet user needs. In this context, a desktop environment typically consists of several separate components, including a window manager (such as Mutter or KWin), a file manager (such as Files or Dolphin), a set of graphical themes, together with toolkits (such as GTK+ and Qt) and libraries for managing the desktop. All these individual modules can be exchanged and independently configured to suit users, but most desktop environments provide a default configuration that works with minimal user setup.

Some window managers‍—‌such as IceWM, Fluxbox, Openbox, ROX Desktop and Window Maker‍—‌contain relatively sparse desktop environment elements, such as an integrated spatial file manager, while others like evilwm and wmii do not provide such elements. Not all of the program code that is part of a desktop environment has effects which are directly visible to the user. Some of it may be low-level code. KDE, for example, provides so-called KIO slaves which give the user access to a wide range of virtual devices. These I/O slaves are not available outside the KDE environment.

In 1996 the KDE was announced, followed in 1997 by the announcement of GNOME. Xfce is a smaller project that was also founded in 1996, and focuses on speed and modularity, just like LXDE which was started in 2006. A comparison of X Window System desktop environments demonstrates the differences between environments. GNOME and KDE were usually seen as dominant solutions, and these are still often installed by default on Linux systems. Each of them offers:

- To programmers, a set of standard APIs, a programming environment, and human interface guidelines.
- To translators, a collaboration infrastructure. KDE and GNOME are available in many languages.
- To artists, a workspace to share their talents.
- To ergonomics specialists, the chance to help simplify the working environment.
- To developers of third-party applications, a reference environment for integration. OpenOffice.org is one such application.
- To users, a complete desktop environment and a suite of essential applications. These include a file manager, web browser, multimedia player, email client, address book, PDF reader, photo manager, and system preferences application.

In the early 2000s, KDE reached maturity. The Appeal and ToPaZ projects focused on bringing new advances to the next major releases of both KDE and GNOME respectively. Although striving for broadly similar goals, GNOME and KDE do differ in their approach to user ergonomics. KDE encourages applications to integrate and interoperate, is highly customizable, and contains many complex features, all whilst trying to establish sensible defaults. GNOME on the other hand is more prescriptive, and focuses on the finer details of essential tasks and overall simplification. Accordingly, each one attracts a different user and developer community. Technically, there are numerous technologies common to all Unix-like desktop environments, most obviously the X Window System. Accordingly, the freedesktop.org project was established as an informal collaboration zone with the goal being to reduce duplication of effort.

As GNOME and KDE focus on high-performance computers, users of less powerful or older computers often prefer alternative desktop environments specifically created for low-performance systems. Most commonly used lightweight desktop environments include LXDE and Xfce; they both use GTK+, which is the same underlying toolkit GNOME uses. The MATE desktop environment, a fork of GNOME 2, is comparable to Xfce in its use of RAM and processor cycles, but is often considered more as an alternative to other lightweight desktop environments.

For a while, GNOME and KDE enjoyed the status of the most popular Linux desktop environments; later, other desktop environments grew in popularity. In April 2011, GNOME introduced a new interface concept with its version 3, while a popular Linux distribution Ubuntu introduced its own new desktop environment, Unity. Some users preferred to keep the traditional interface concept of GNOME 2, resulting in the creation of MATE as a GNOME 2 fork.

== Examples of desktop environments ==
The most common desktop environment on personal computers is Windows Shell in Microsoft Windows. Microsoft has made significant efforts in making Windows shell visually pleasing. As a result, Microsoft has introduced theme support in Windows 98, the various Windows XP visual styles, the Aero brand in Windows Vista, the Microsoft design language (codenamed "Metro") in Windows 8, and the Fluent Design System and Windows Spotlight in Windows 10. Windows shell can be extended via Shell extensions.

Many mainstream desktop environments for Unix-like operating systems, including KDE, GNOME, Xfce, and LXDE, use the X Window System or Wayland, any of which may be selected by users, and are not tied exclusively to the operating system in use. The desktop environment for macOS, which is also a Unix-like system, is Aqua, which uses the Quartz graphics layer, rather than using X or Wayland.

A number of other desktop environments also exist, including (but not limited to) CDE, EDE, GEM, IRIX Interactive Desktop, Sun's Java Desktop System, Jesktop, Mezzo, Project Looking Glass, ROX Desktop, UDE, Xito, XFast. Moreover, there exists FVWM-Crystal, which consists of a powerful configuration for the FVWM window manager, a theme and further adds, altogether forming a "construction kit" for building up a desktop environment.

X window managers that are meant to be usable stand-alone — without another desktop environment — also include elements reminiscent of those found in typical desktop environments, most prominently Enlightenment. Other examples include OpenBox, Fluxbox, WindowLab, Fvwm, as well as Window Maker and AfterStep, which both feature the NeXTSTEP GUI look and feel.

The Amiga approach to desktop environment was noteworthy: the original Workbench desktop environment in AmigaOS evolved through time to originate an entire family of descendants and alternative desktop solutions. Some of those descendants are the Scalos, the Ambient desktop of MorphOS, and the Wanderer desktop of the AROS open source OS. WindowLab also contains features reminiscent of the Amiga UI. Third-party Directory Opus software, which was originally just a navigational file manager program, evolved to become a complete Amiga desktop replacement called Directory Opus Magellan.

OS/2 (and derivatives such as eComStation and ArcaOS) use the Workplace Shell. Earlier versions of OS/2 used the Presentation Manager.

The BumpTop project was an experimental desktop environment. Its main objective is to replace the 2D paradigm with a "real-world" 3D implementation, where documents can be freely manipulated across a virtual table.

=== Gallery ===
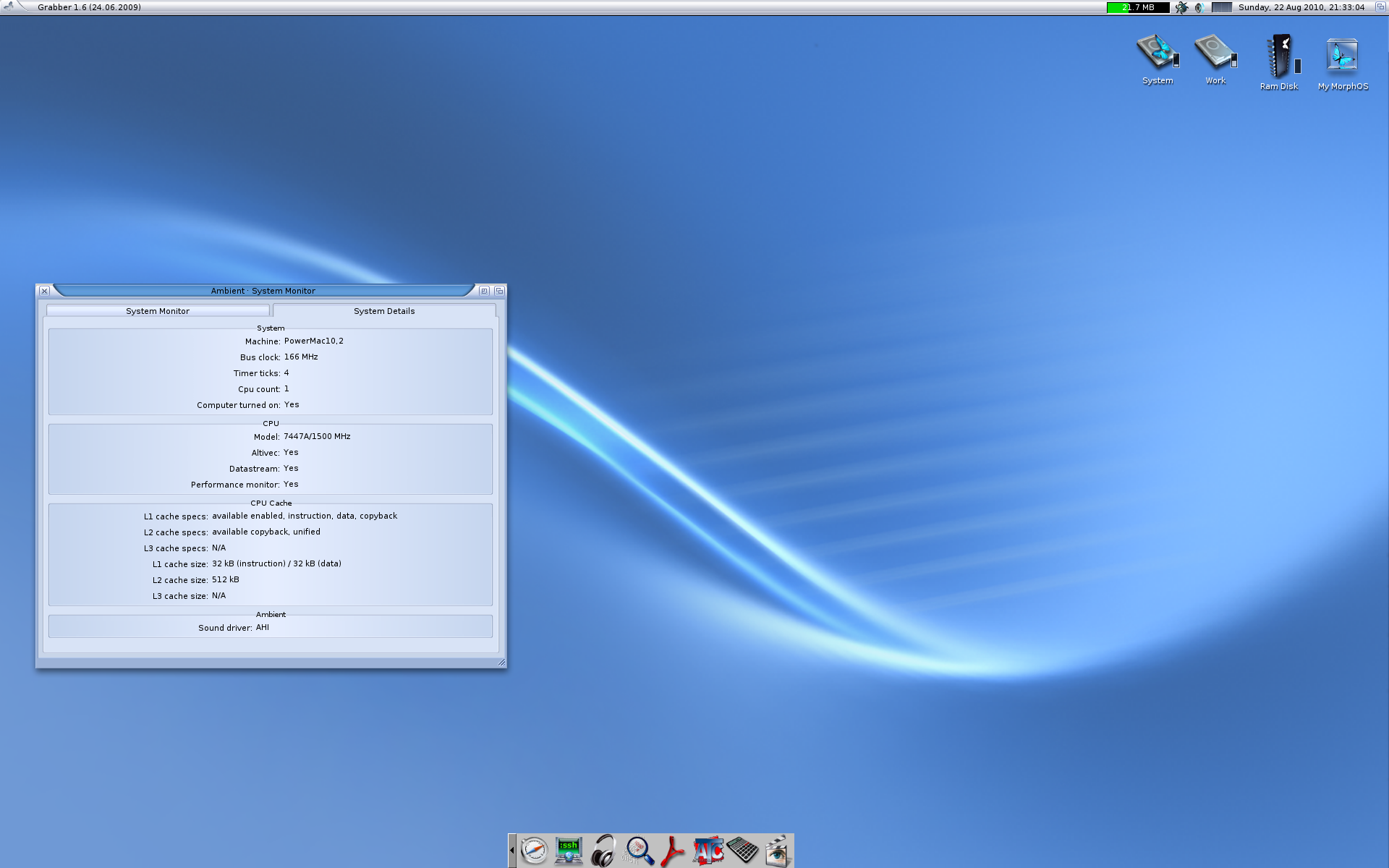
Ambient

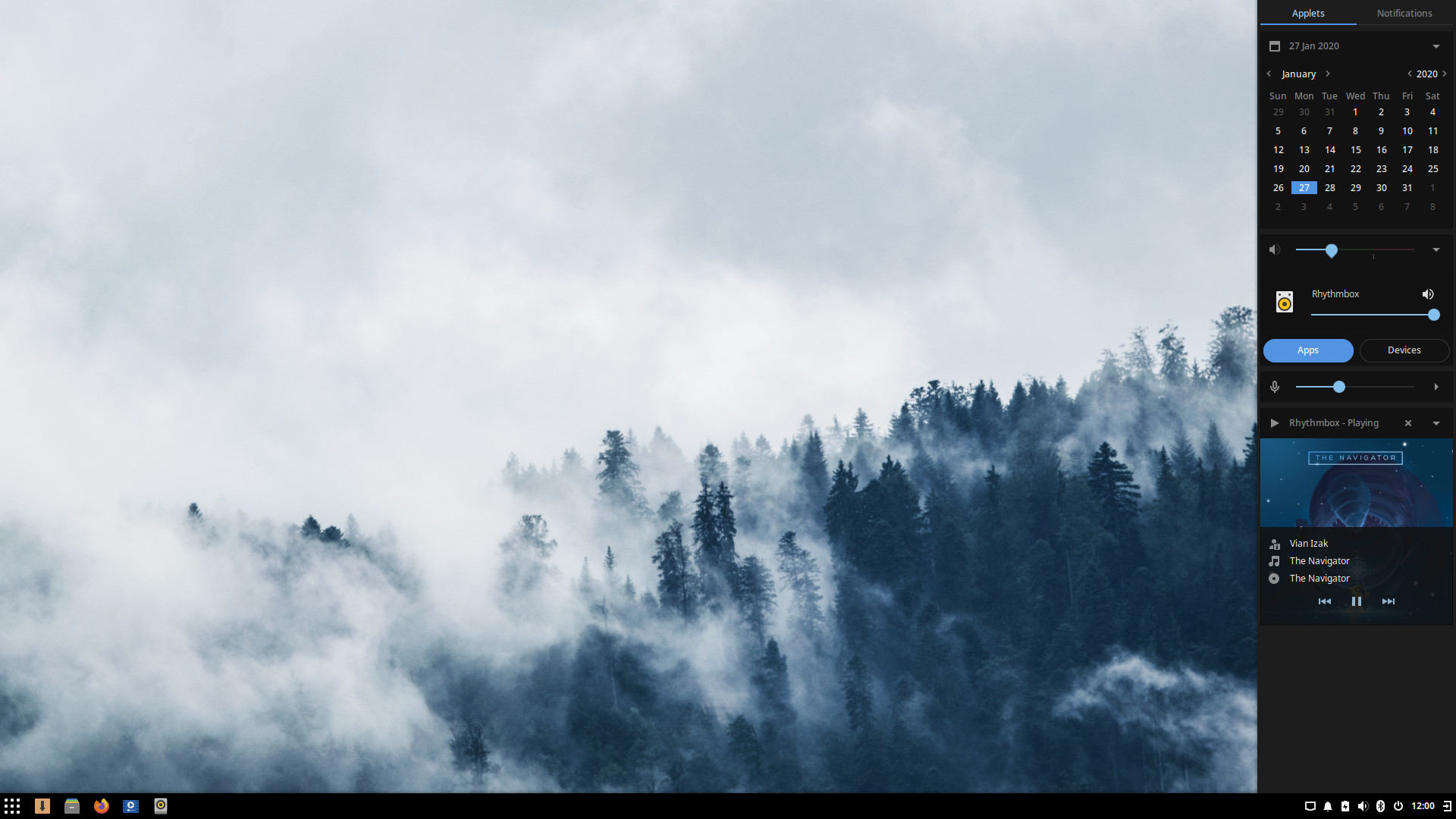
Budgie

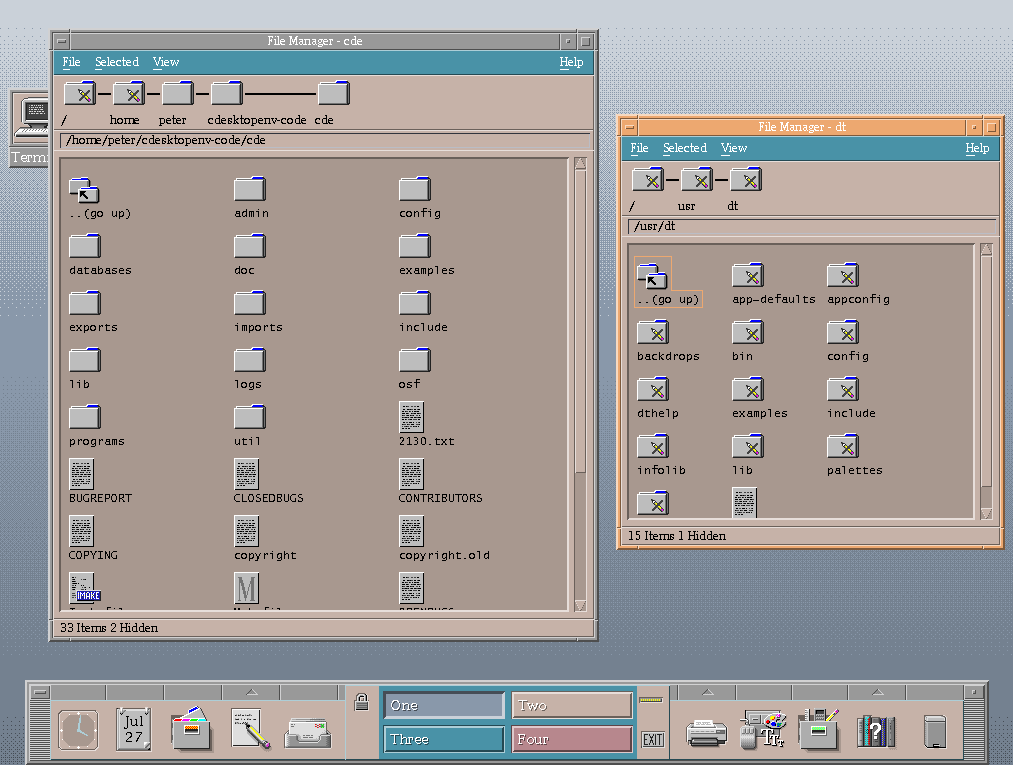
CDE

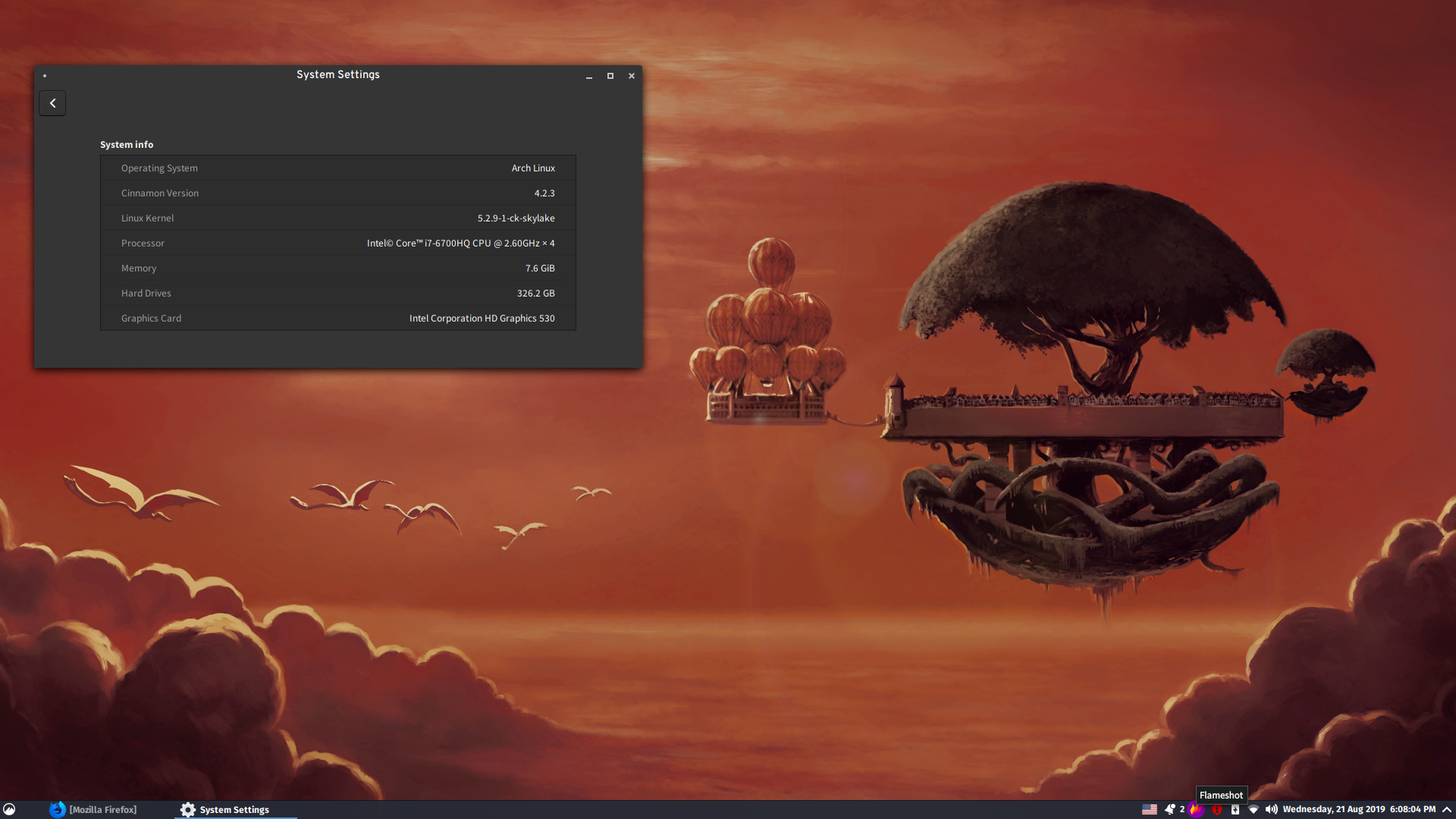
Cinnamon

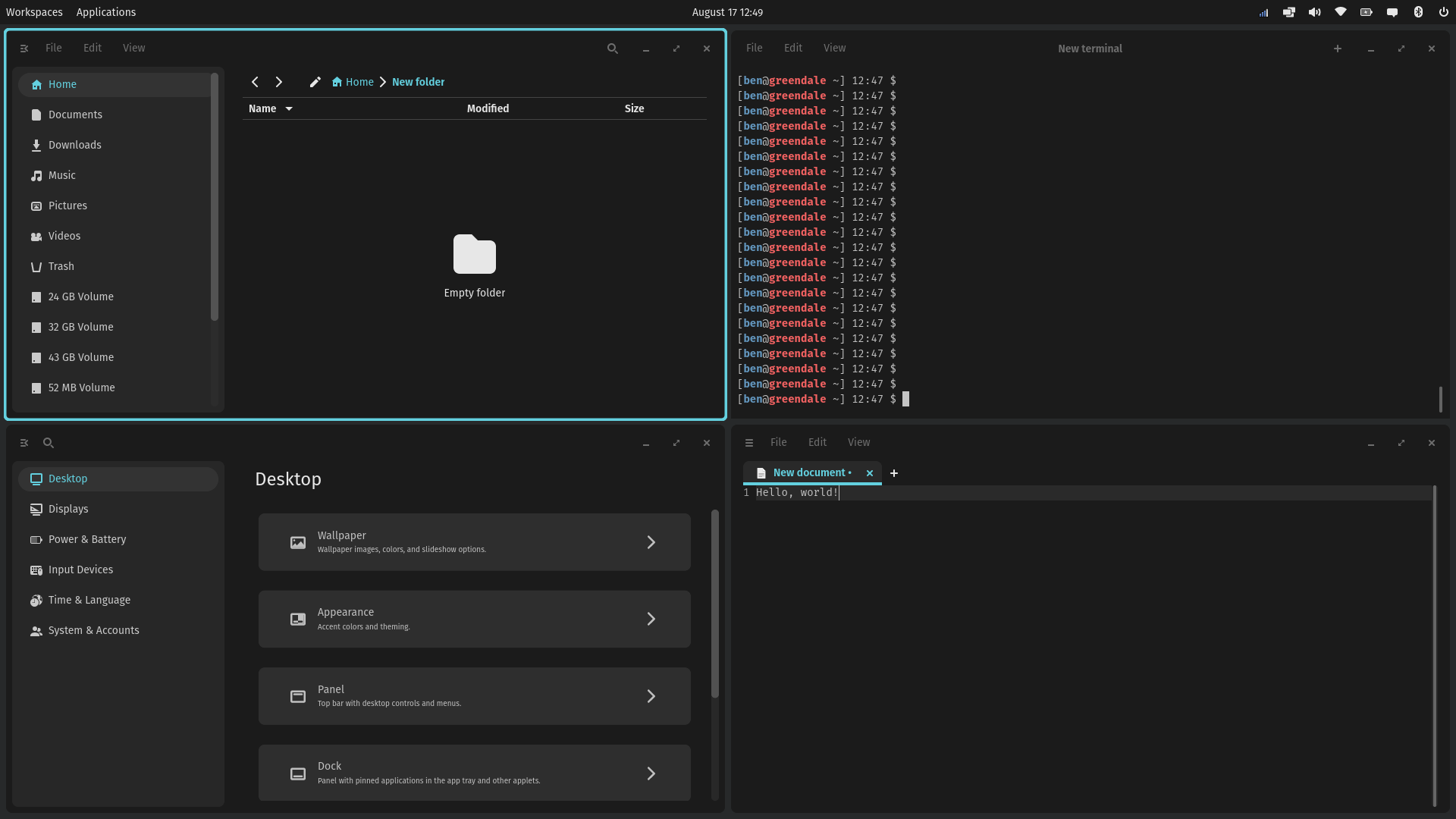
COSMIC

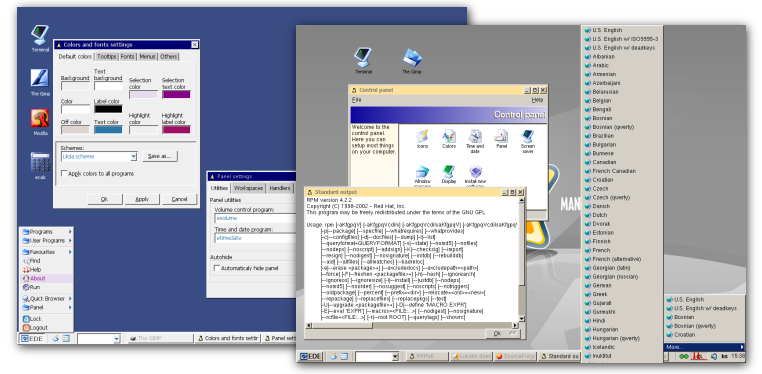
EDE

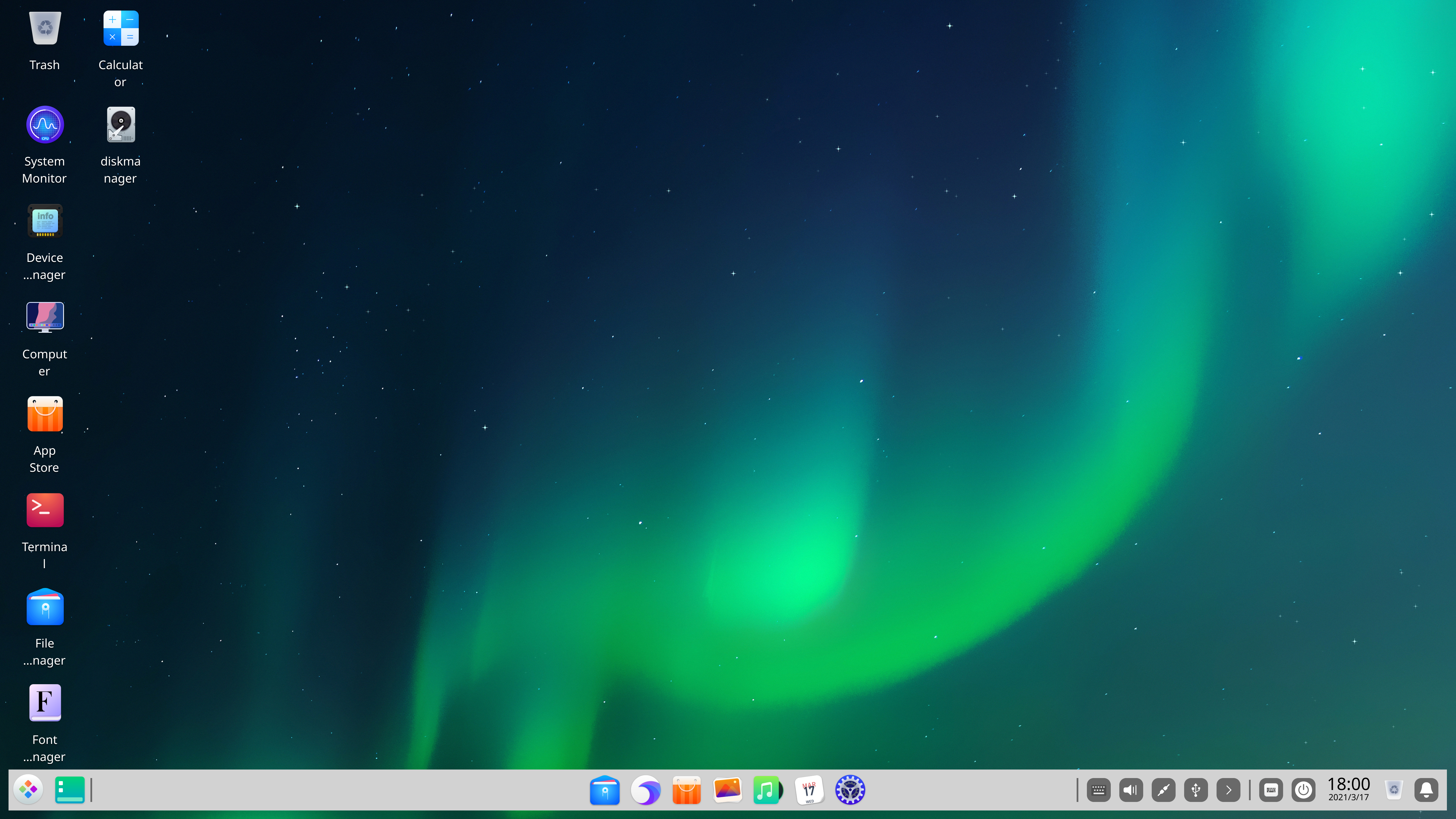
Deepin DE

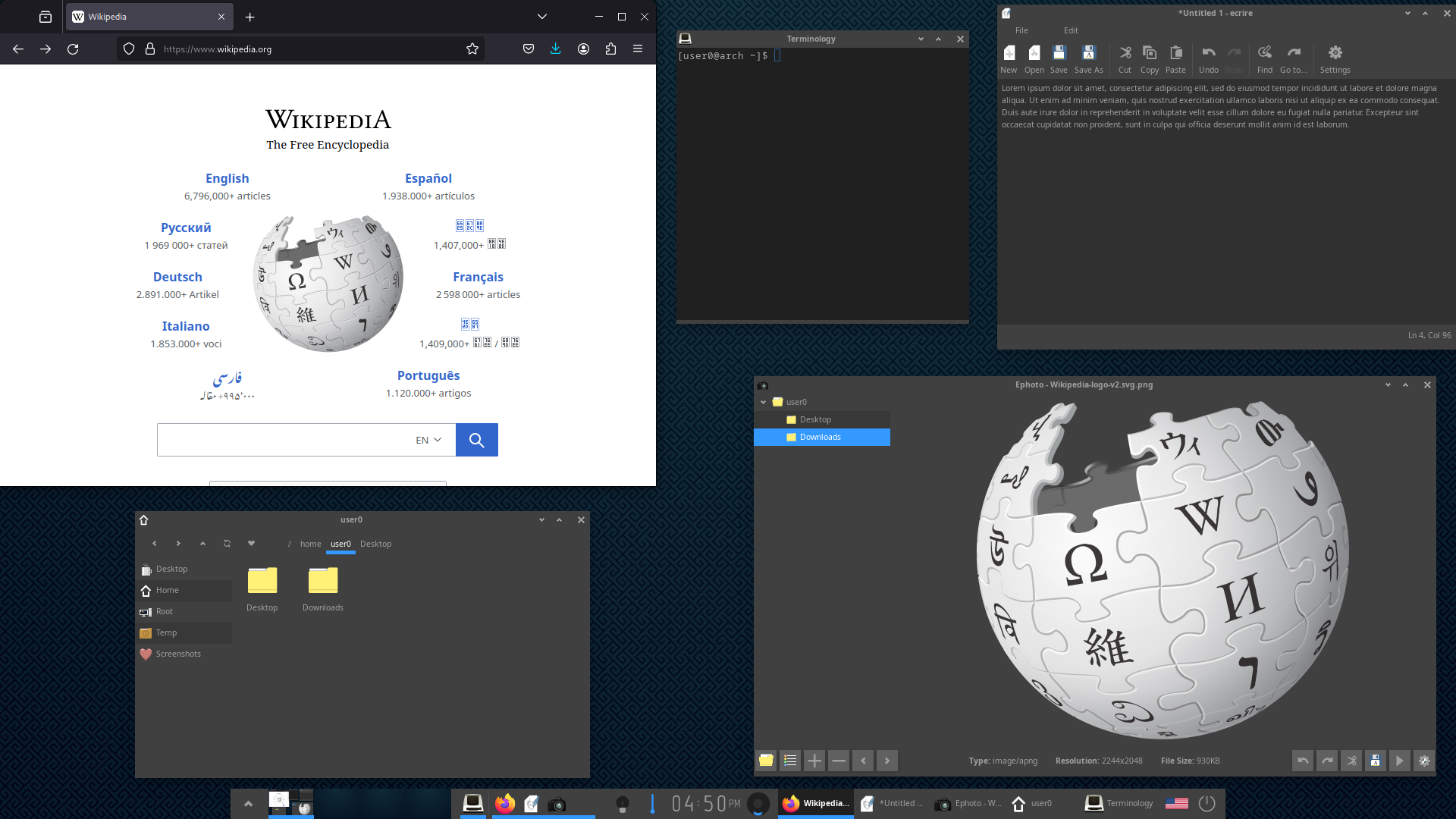
Enlightenment

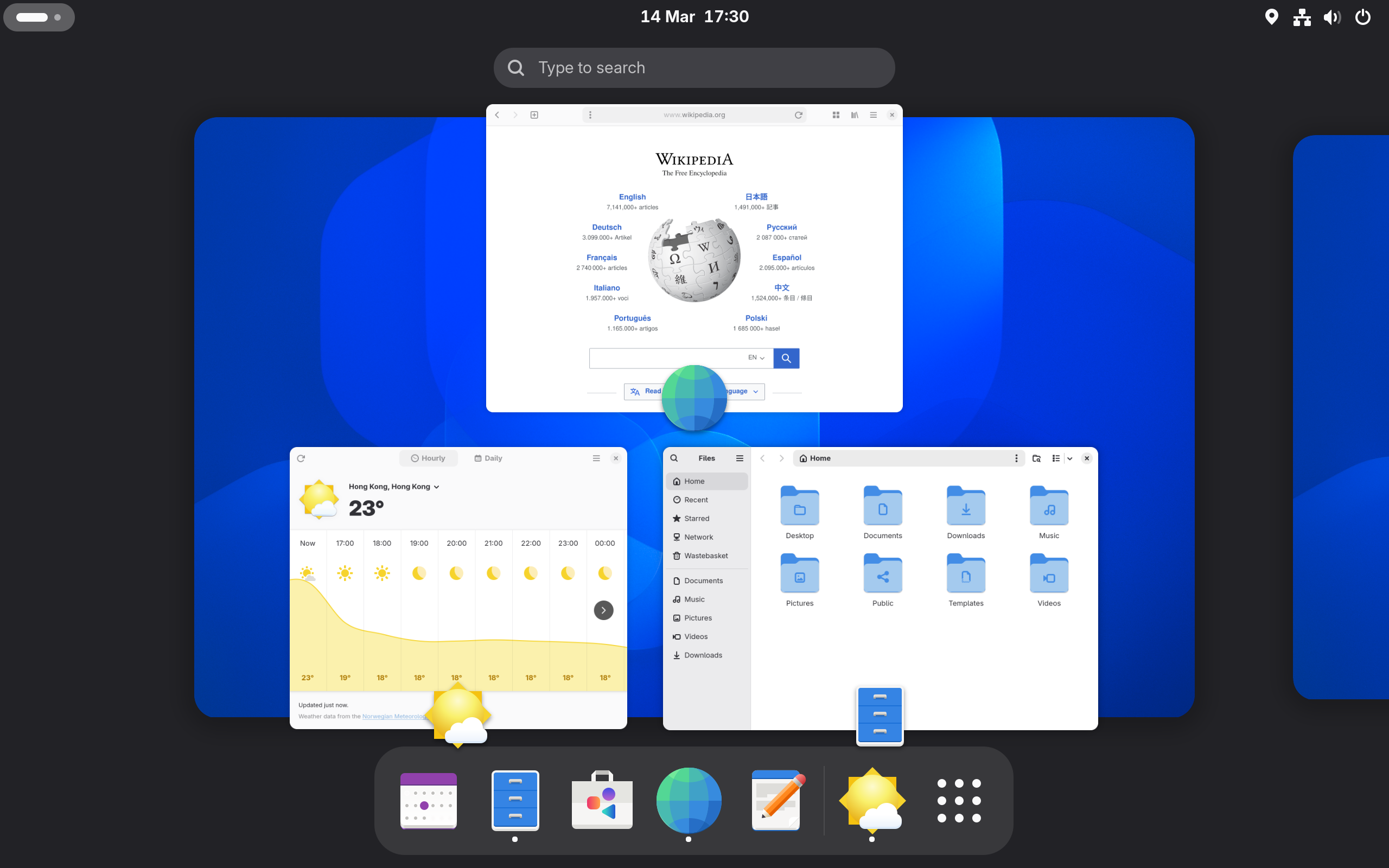
GNOME Shell

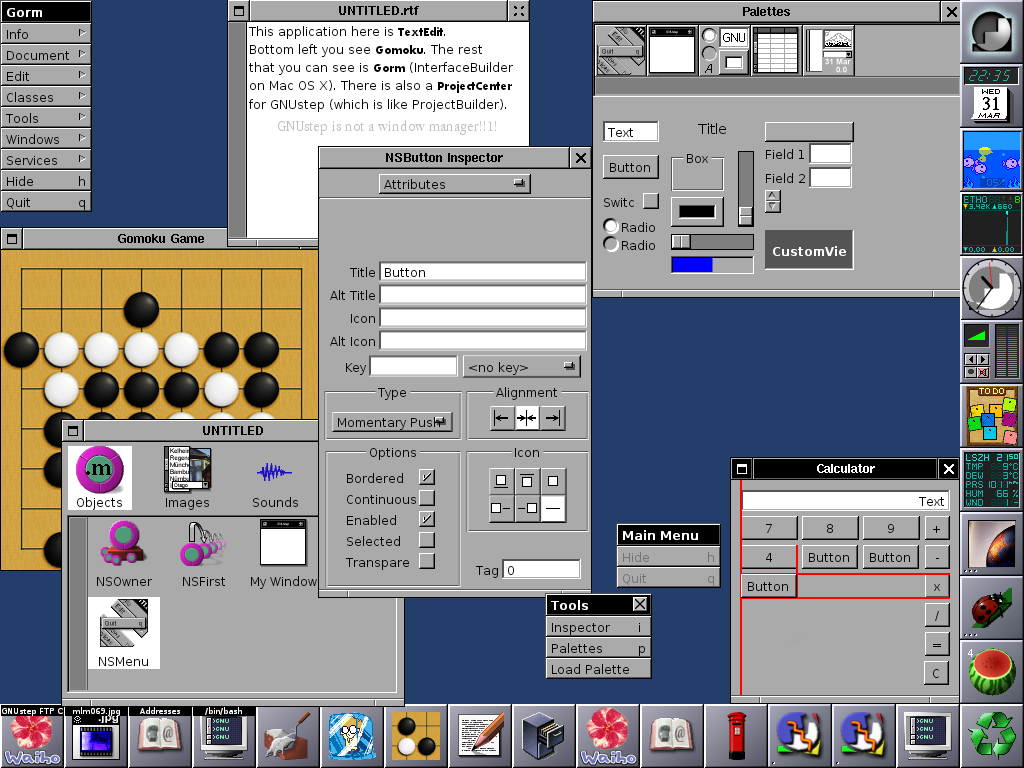
GNUstep/Window Maker

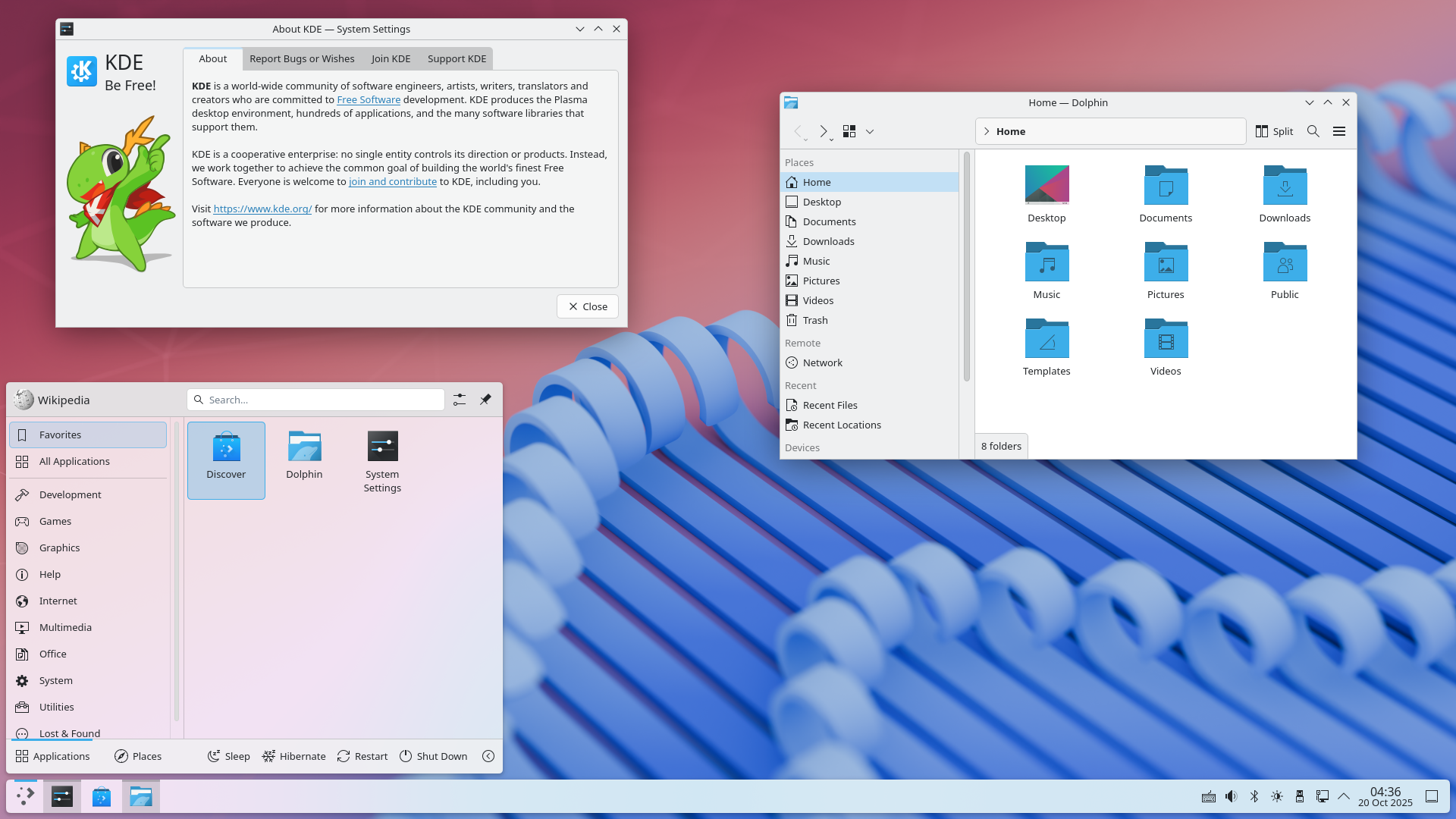
KDE Plasma 6

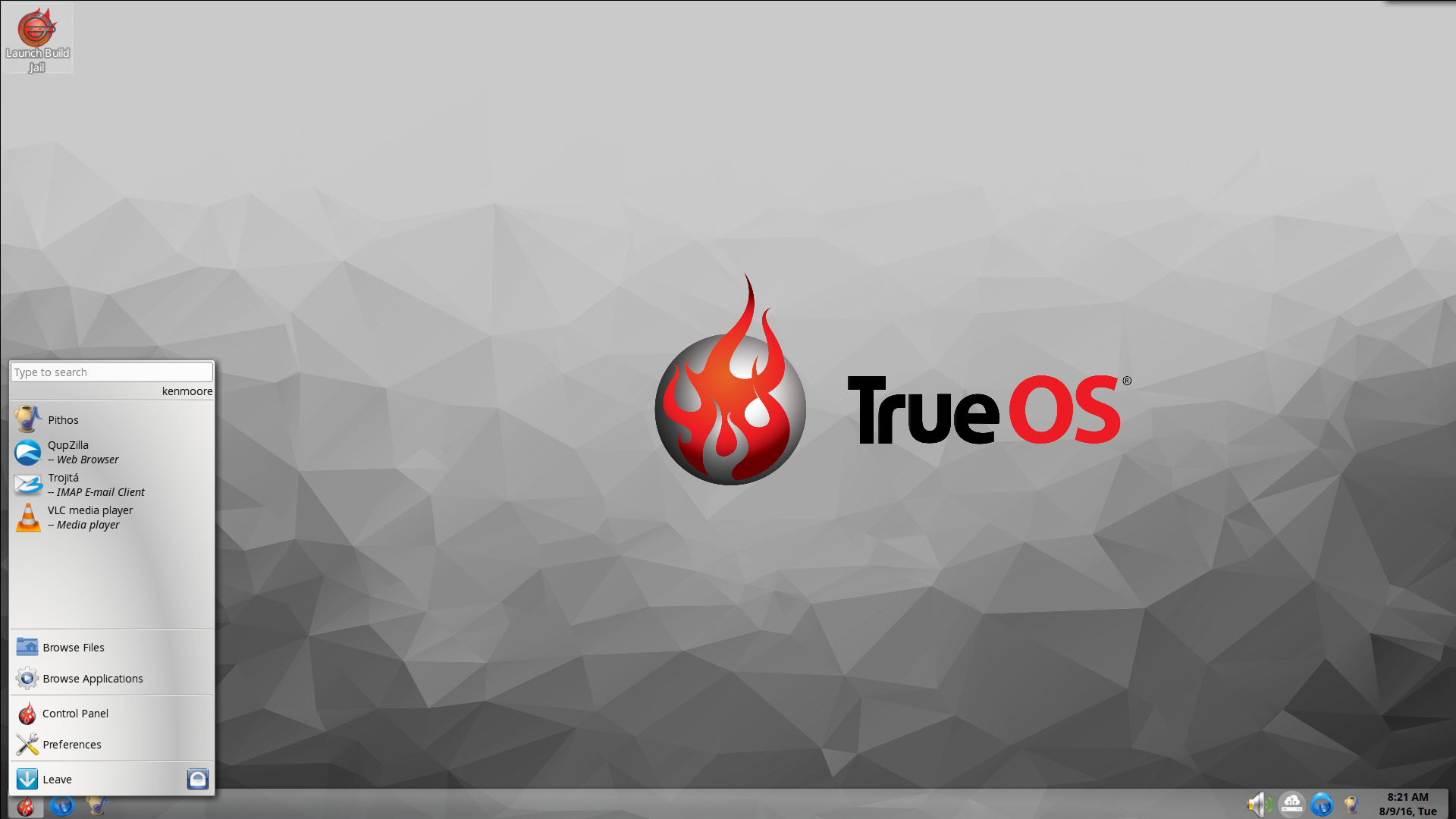
Lumina

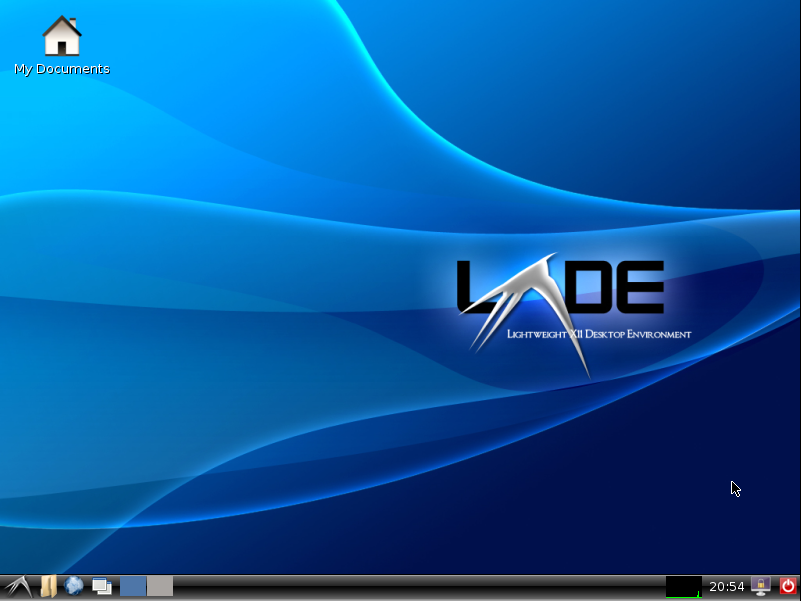
LXDE

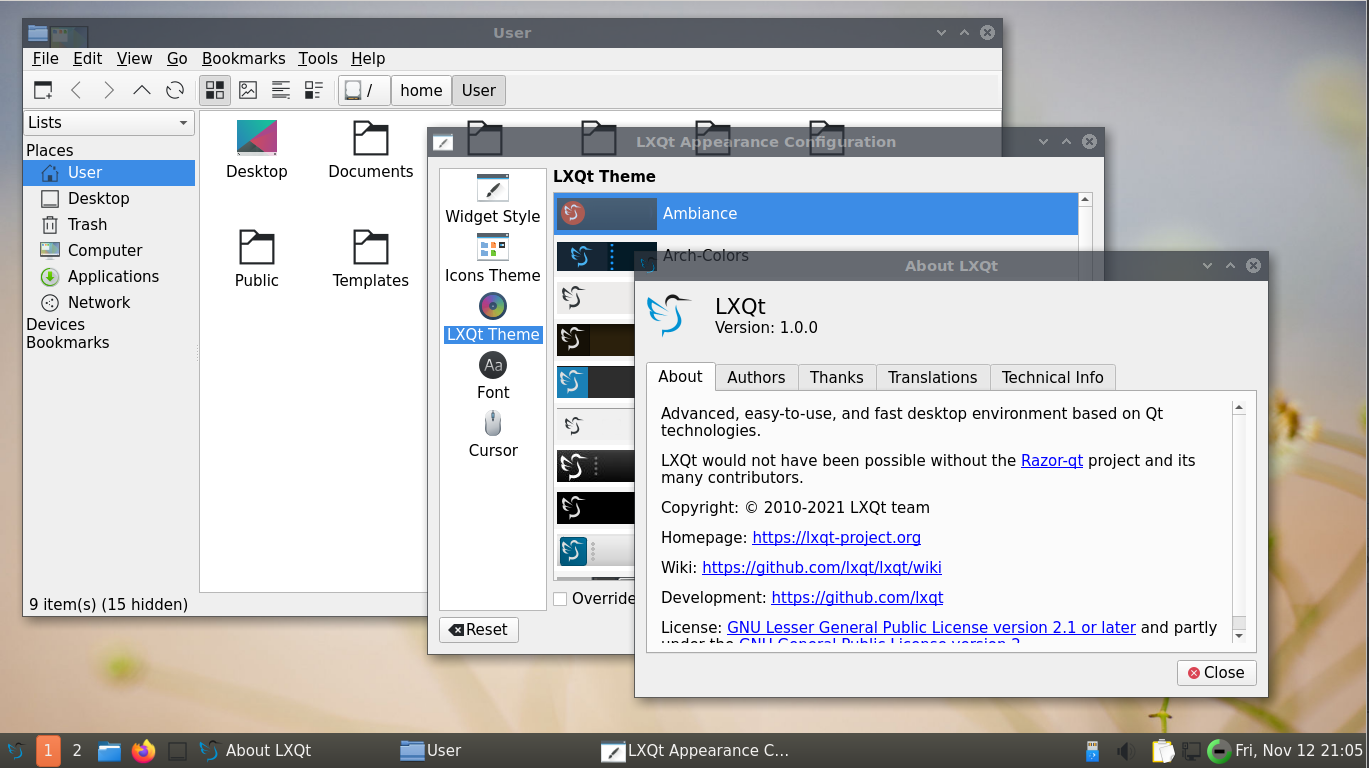
LXQt

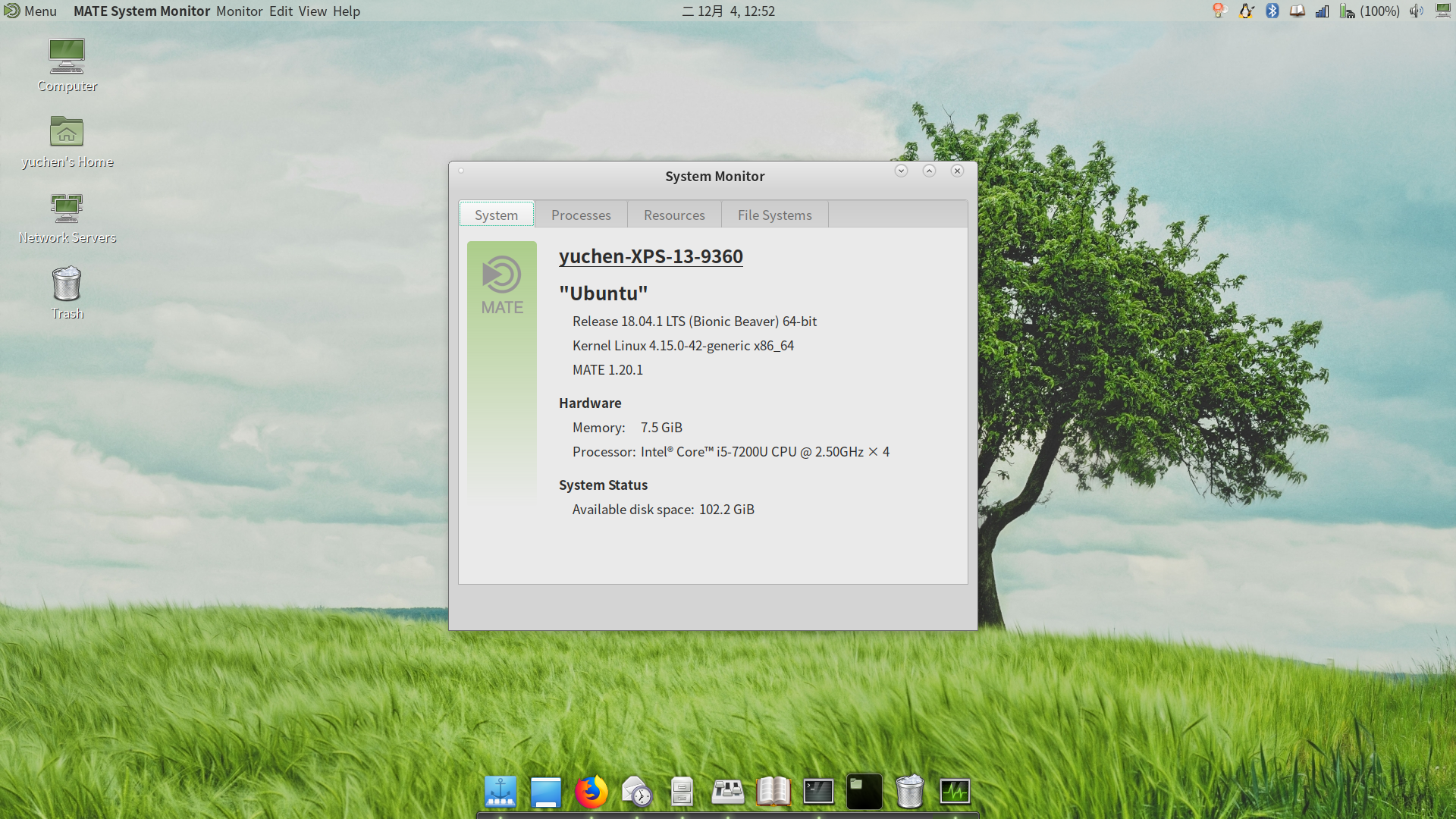
MATE

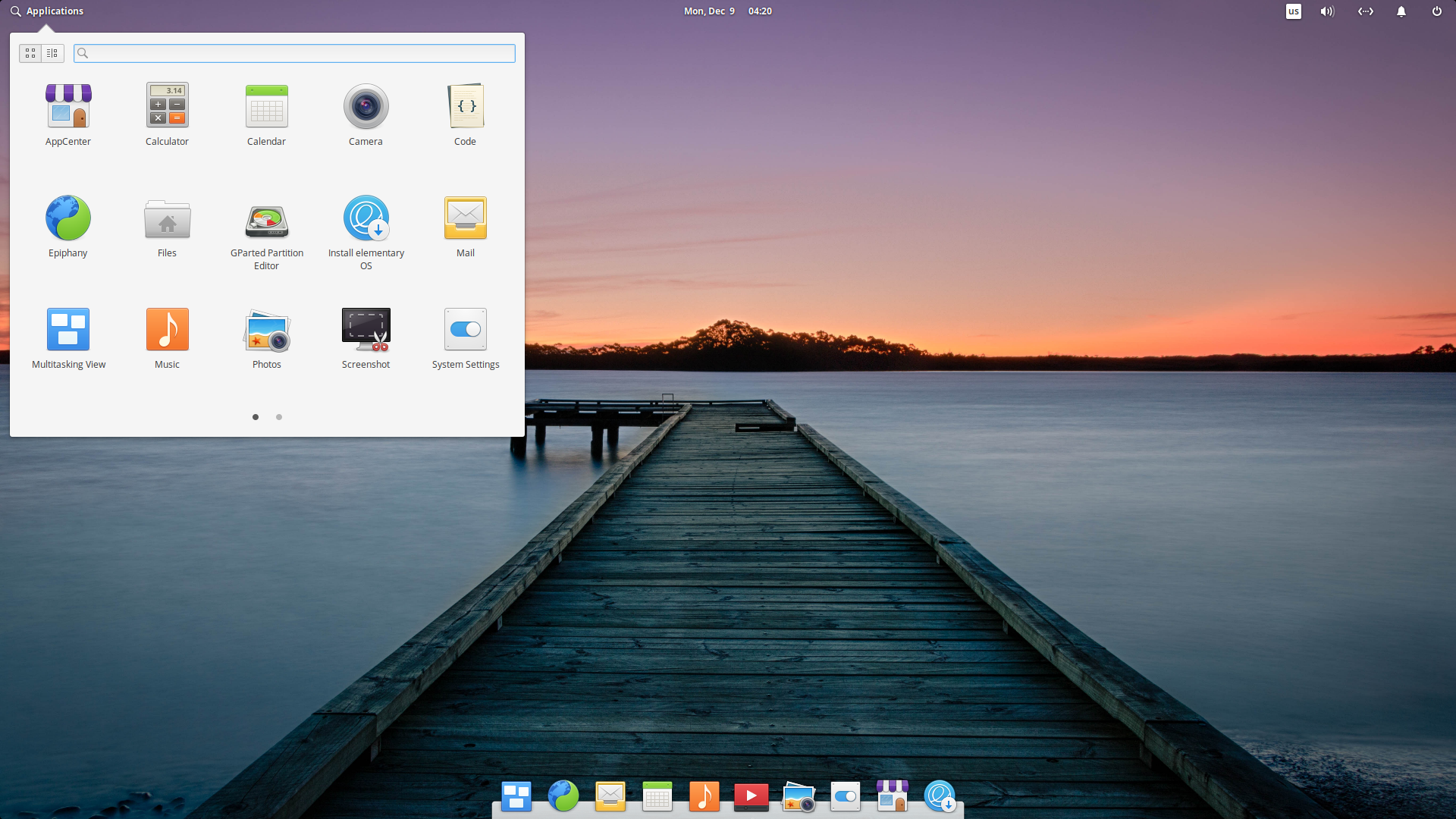
Pantheon

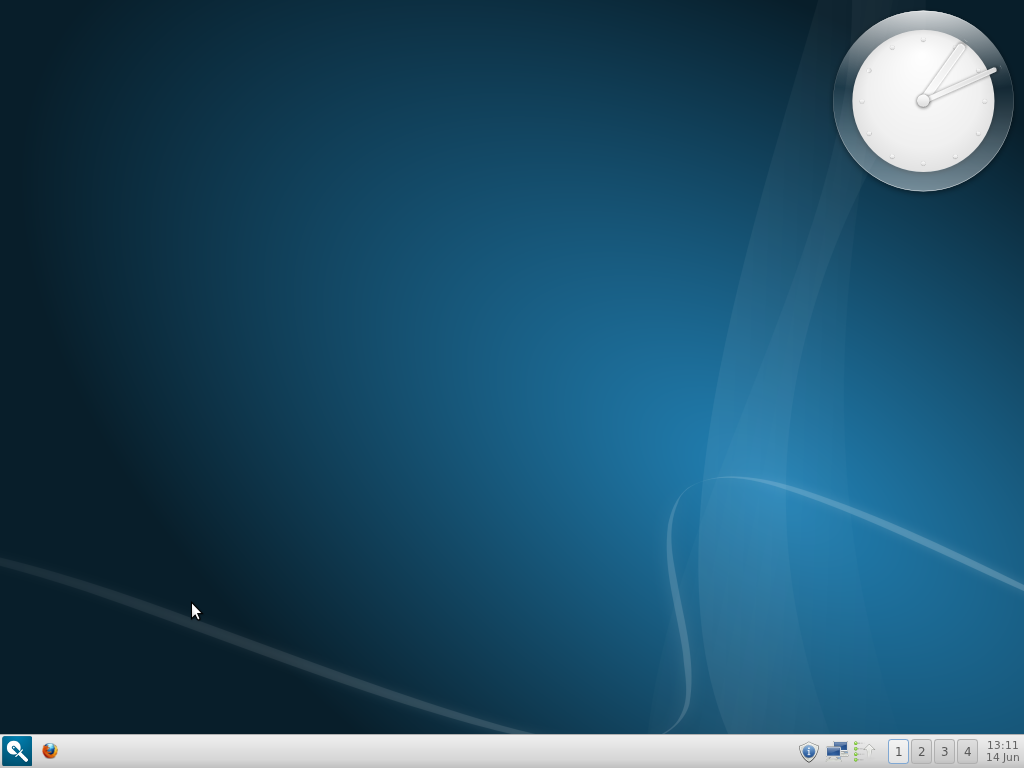
Razor-qt

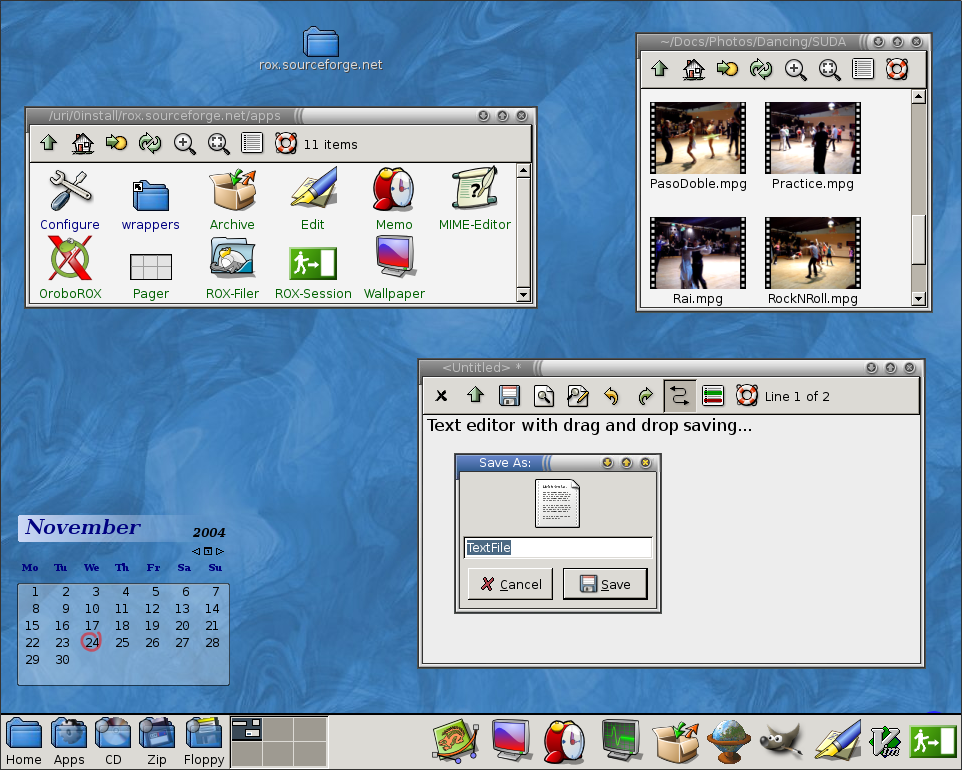
ROX Desktop

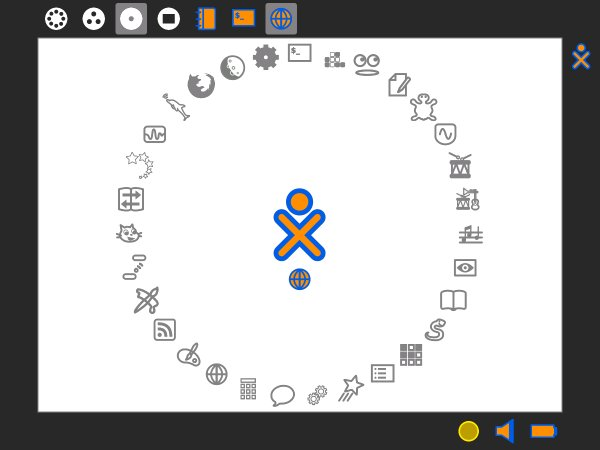
Sugar

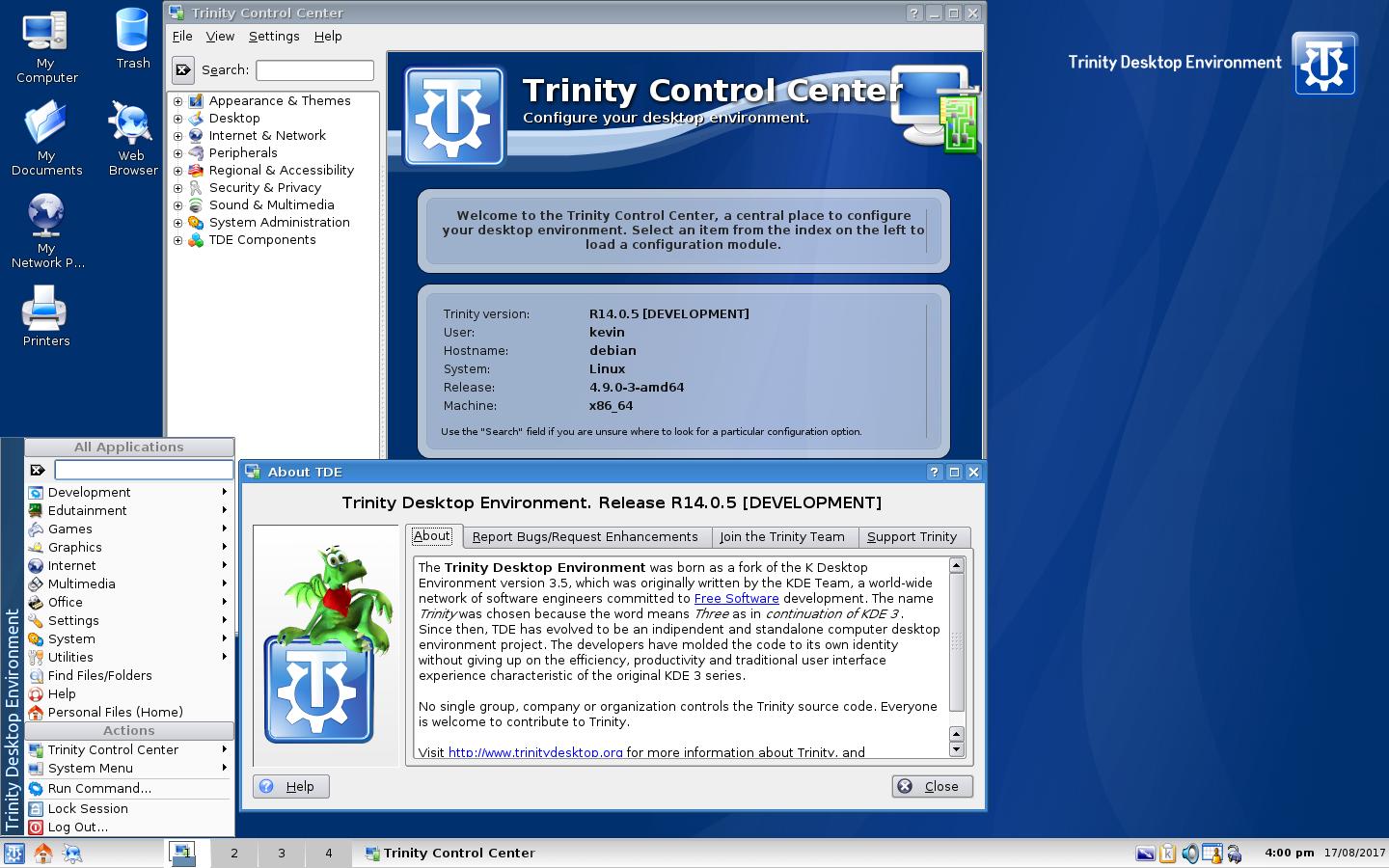
Trinity

UDE

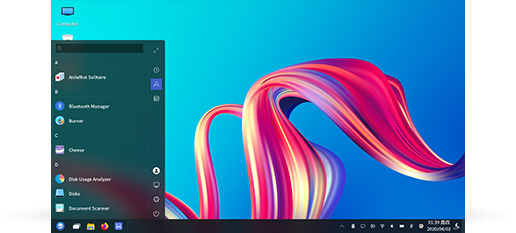
UKUI (desktop environment)

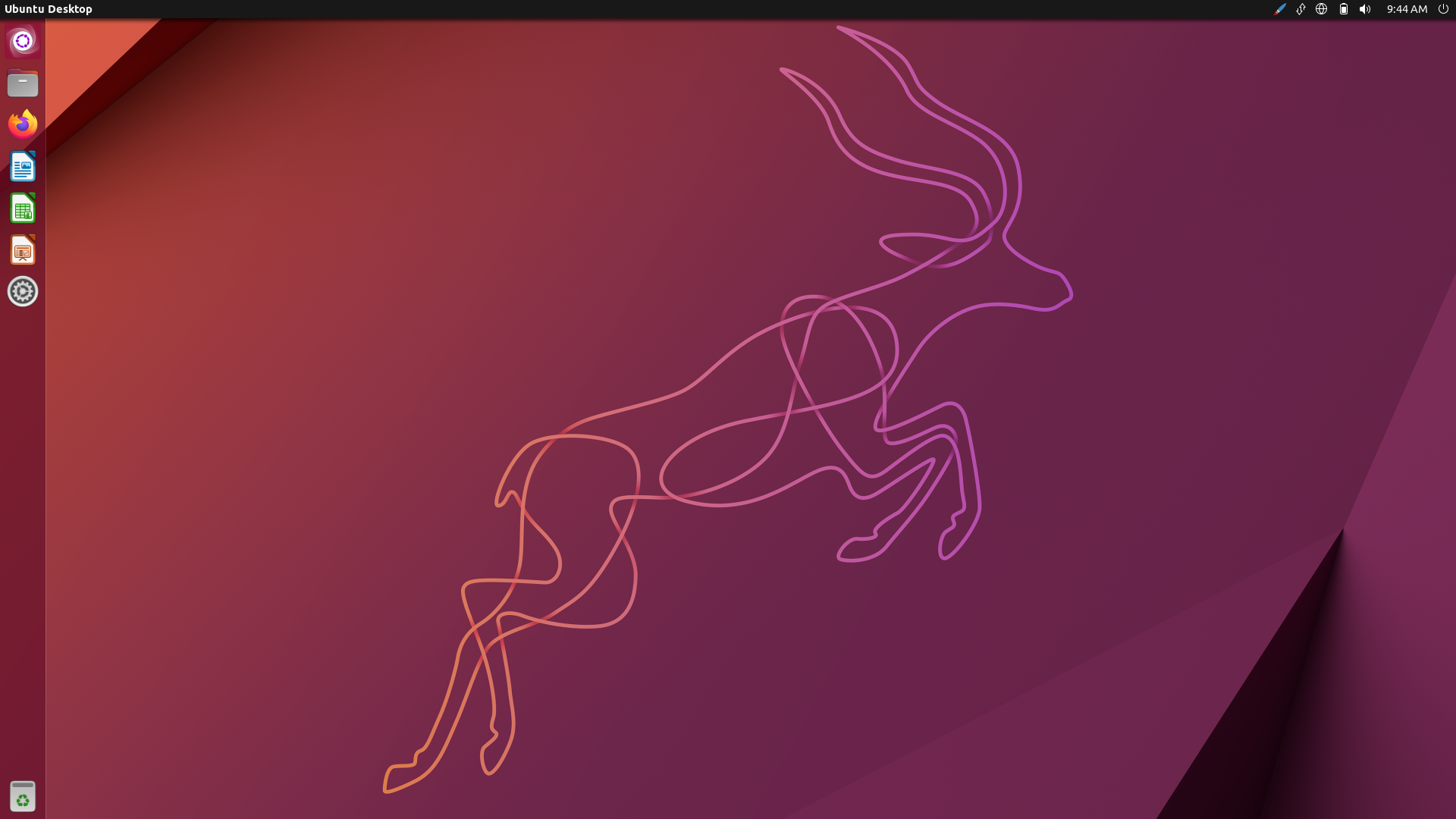
Unity

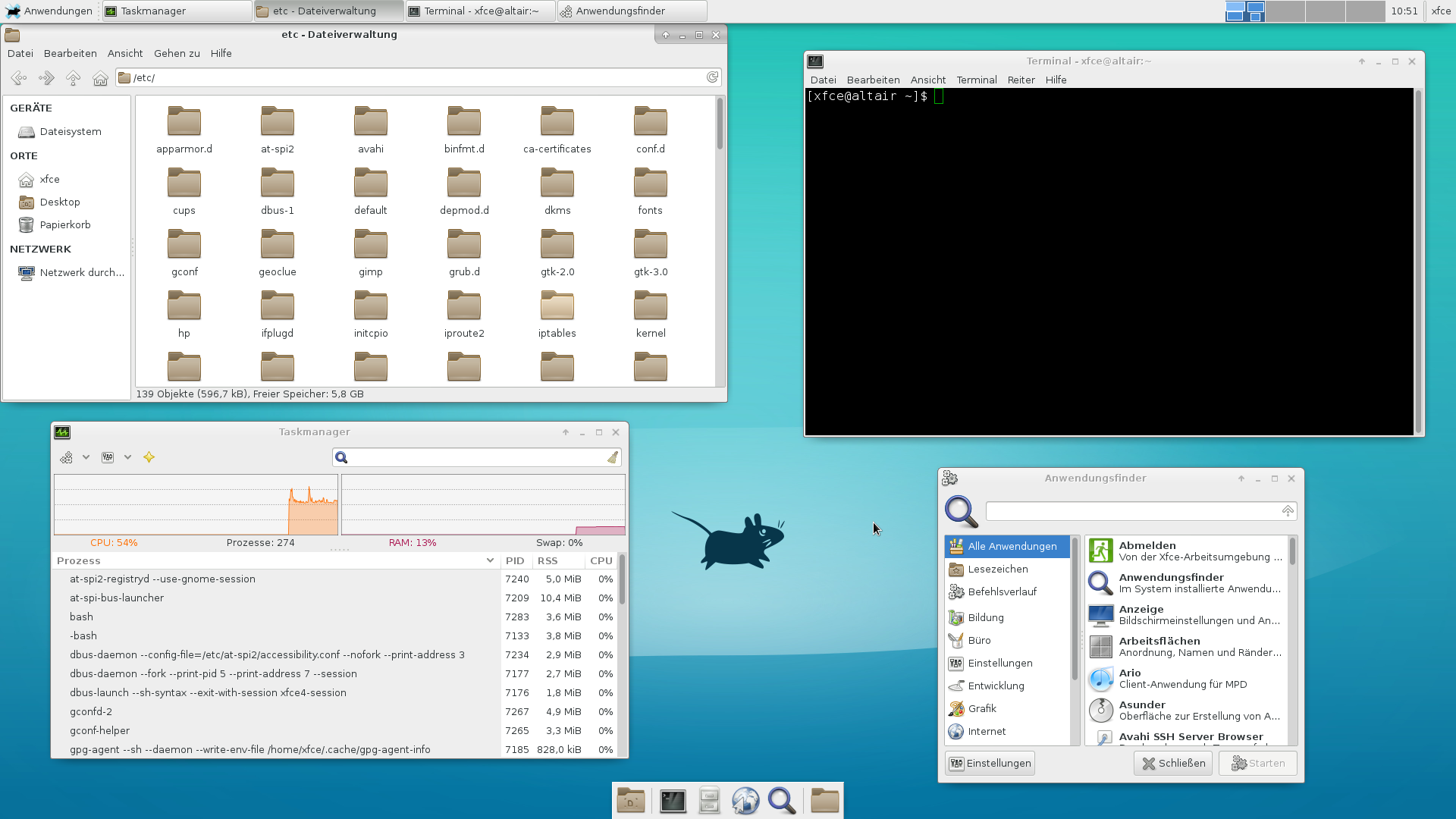
Xfce

== See also ==
- Wayland – an alternative to the X Window System which can run several different desktop environments
- Comparison of X Window System desktop environments
