= Budgie (desktop environment) =

Desktop environment for Unix-like operating systems

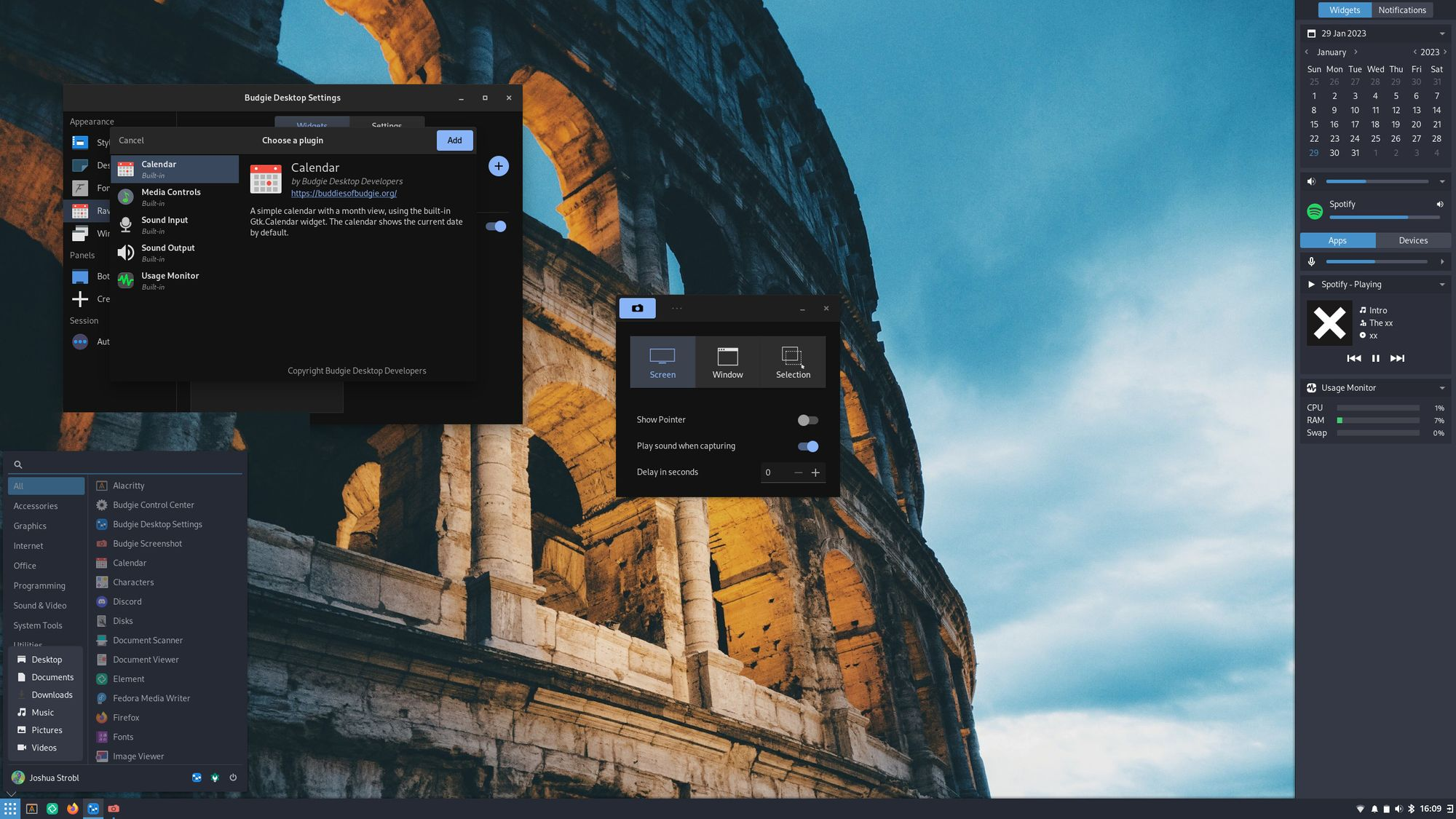
- Screenshot of a typical Budgie desktop with Raven panel.
- Original authors: Ikey Doherty, Solus Project
- Developer: Buddies of Budgie
- Release: February 17, 2014; 12 years ago
- Stable release: 10.10.4 / 1 November 2026; 9 days ago
- Written in: C, Vala, C++
- Operating system: Unix-like operating system
- Platform: Wayland
- Available in: 71 languages
- Type: Desktop environment
- License: GNU LGPLv2.1 for libraries, GNU GPLv2 for binaries
- Website: https://buddiesofbudgie.org
- Repository: github.com/BuddiesOfBudgie/budgie-desktop

Budgie is an independent, free and open-source desktop environment for Linux and other Unix-like operating systems that targets the desktop metaphor. Budgie is developed by the Buddies of Budgie organization, which is composed of a team of contributors from Linux distributions such as Fedora, Debian, and Arch Linux. Its design emphasizes simplicity, minimalism, and elegance, while providing the means to extend or customize the desktop in various ways. Unlike desktop environments like Cinnamon, Budgie does not have a reference platform, and all distributions that ship Budgie are recommended to set defaults that best fit their desired user experience. Budgie is also shipped as an edition of certain Linux distributions, such as Ubuntu Budgie.

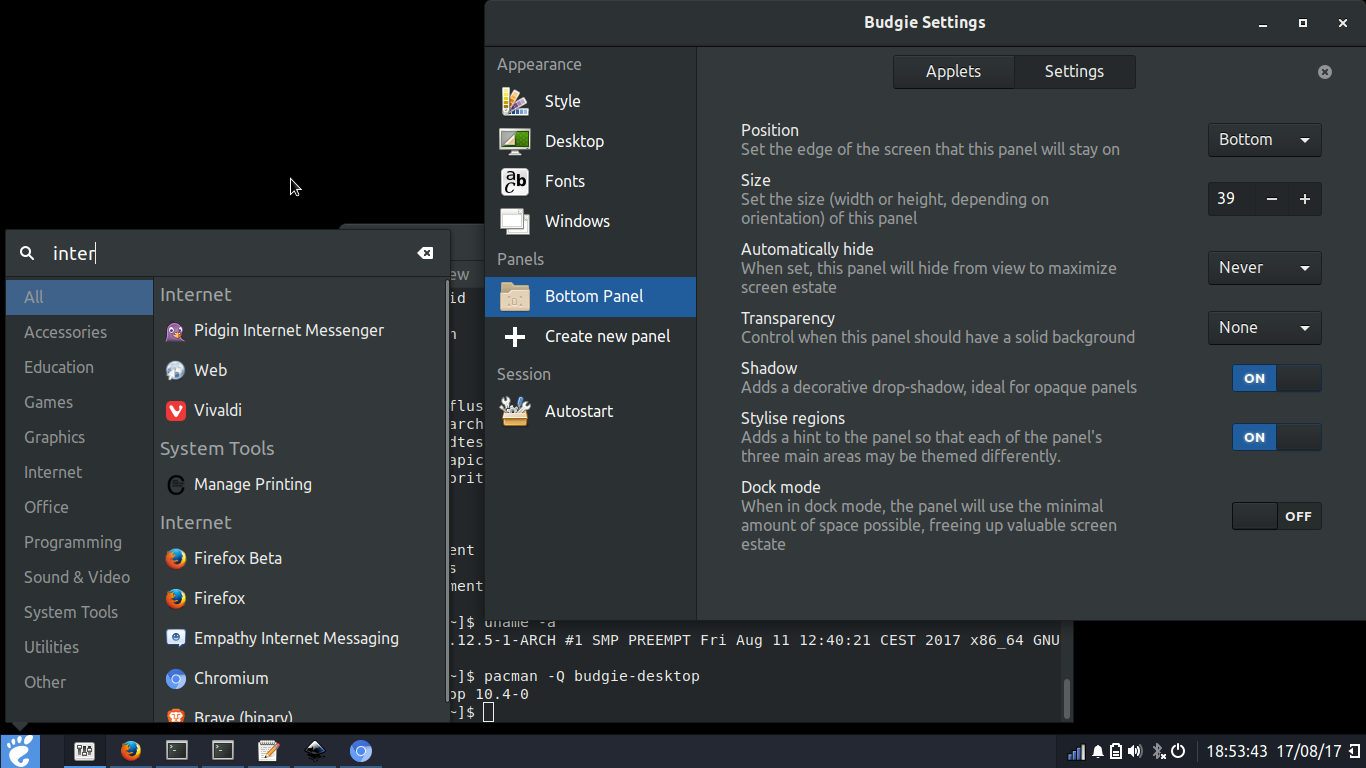
Budgie (desktop environment) v10.4

== History ==
Budgie was created by Ikey Doherty as the default desktop environment for his new Linux distribution, EvolveOS, which was eventually renamed to Solus. The intention was to use GNOME components to create a more lightweight and traditional desktop that still had most of the features that GNOME provided at the time. Development was announced on December 14, 2013, with the first public version being released soon after on February 17, 2014.

Budgie had a flurry of releases in 2015, culminating in version 10 being released in December of that year, a full rewrite of the codebase in the Vala programming language. The desktop soon spread to distributions other than Solus, with SparkyLinux and Manjaro adopting the desktop environment in 2015. Arch Linux, Ubuntu, and Void Linux followed in 2016, with a dedicated "remix" edition for Ubuntu being created, eventually renamed to Ubuntu Budgie when it was adopted by Canonical as an official flavor.

Doherty made his last commit to the repository on 26 June 2018. Later, on October 27, 2018, it was announced that Doherty had ceased communication with the rest of the Solus team for unknown reasons, leaving Solus (and thus Budgie) without a lead developer. Joshua Strobl, one of the members of the newly formed Solus core team and an already active contributor to Budgie, took up the responsibility of continuing Budgie's development after Doherty's departure.

On January 1, 2022, Strobl resigned from Solus and established Buddies of Budgie, a new organization for Budgie development, with other active contributors. Under this new organization, Budgie development shifted from being focused on Solus to being focused on improving the experience across all distributions that ship Budgie. The first release under this new organization was v10.6, released on March 6, 2022.

The desktop had incremental releases in 2022. During this time, contributors to the project that had ceased involvement with Solus began contributing to other Linux distributions. Notably, Joshua Strobl began contributing to Fedora Linux, leading to the inclusion of Budgie in the Fedora repositories and the approval of a Fedora Budgie "spin" to be released with Fedora 38.

In 2023, v10.7 was released, the second major release under Buddies of Budgie, and inclusion of the Budgie package set into both FreeBSD - the first BSD derivative to ship the desktop - and NixOS.

In January 2026, Buddies of Budgie announced that Budgie 11 would be based on the Qt 6 framework, the first time since moving away from Qt 5 to GTK 3.

== Additional components ==
=== Budgie Desktop View ===
Budgie Desktop View is a software component meant to provide desktop icons within Budgie. Budgie Desktop View is implemented in Vala, and uses GTK 3 for widgets. The source code is available under the Apache License 2.0.

=== Magpie ===
Magpie is a fork of the GNOME Project's Mutter window manager with Wayland support removed, principally intended to reduce the maintenance burden of GNOME stack upgrades by stabilizing on a particular version of the Mutter API. Magpie is implemented in C, and its source code is available under the GNU GPLv2.

=== Budgie Control Center ===
Budgie Control Center is a fork of GNOME Control Center with Budgie-specific settings and features, and is the standard settings application for Budgie. Budgie Control Center is implemented in C, and uses GTK 3 and libhandy for widgets. The source code is available under the GNU GPLv2.

=== Budgie Screensaver ===
Budgie Screensaver is a fork of GNOME Screensaver with additional fixes and minor updates, and serves to provide an authentication prompt when the system is locked. Budgie Screensaver is implemented in C, and uses GTK 3 for widgets. The source code is available under the GNU GPLv2.

=== Budgie Backgrounds ===
Budgie Backgrounds is Budgie's default set of background images for use with Linux distributions that do not provide their own, and is entirely composed of public domain images. The source code and images are available under the Creative Commons Zero v1.0 license.

== Releases ==
Version	Date	Notes
	December 14, 2013	Development announced.
1	February 17, 2014	First testing release.
2	March 12, 2014	Visual style improvements, additional applets and dialogs.
3	June 22, 2014	Code cleanup and performance improvements.
4	July 12, 2014	Introduction of Vala code; animation, menu, popover, and dialog improvements.
5.1	July 19, 2014	Panel rewritten in Vala, and the addition of a new plugin API for panel applets.
6	August 20, 2014	New panel editor for custom layouts.
7	September 1, 2014	Notifications support and a new XEmbed tray applet.
8	November 16, 2014	Simplified main menu, cleaner animations, and significant theming improvements.
8.1	February 5, 2015	Rewrite of the window manager and updated interface components.
8.2	May 8, 2015	Stability and performance improvements.
8.3	October 24, 2015	Primarily general bug fixes.
10	December 26, 2015	Rewrite from the ground up. Introduced multi-monitor support, the Raven sidebar, and multiple panels.
10.1	December 26, 2015	No release notes.
10.2	December 30, 2015	Vendored nm-applet launcher, new translations, and Raven improvements.
10.3	April 16, 2017	New alt-tab implementation, MPRIS artwork support, and applet improvements.
10.4	August 14, 2017	New applets, plus panel, animation, and personalization improvements.
10.5	March 17, 2019	New applets, improvements to existing applets, improvements to Raven widgets and notification management.
10.6	March 6, 2022	First release under the Buddies of Budgie organization. Significant improvements to application tracking, internal theme polish, a rewritten notification system, and updates to the default layout.
10.7	January 29, 2023	Major re-architectures, new APIs for extensibility, and polish to the user experience.
10.8	August 20, 2023	Merge Trash Applet, add support for Magpie v0, move system tray to Status Notifier.

== Adoption ==
Distribution	Since version	Since date	Installation method	Notes
Arch Linux	Rolling	2016-03-04	Manual	
Debian	9 "stretch"	2017-06-17	Manual	
EndeavourOS	2019.12.22	2019-12-22	Profile	
Fedora Linux	37	2022-11-15	Official ISO	as Fedora Budgie
FreeBSD		2023-03-04	Manual	
GeckoLinux	152.200830.0	2020-09-01	Official ISO	
Gentoo Linux	Rolling	2021-06-18	Community	
Manjaro	15.11	2015-11-02	Community ISO	
NixOS	23.05	2023-05-05	Profile	
OpenMandriva Lx	4.0	2019-06-16	Manual	
openSUSE	Leap 15.0	2018-05-25	Profile	
Solus	EvolveOS Alpha 1	2014-07-06	Official ISO	
SparkyLinux	3.6-dev1	2015-02-02	Manual	
SpiralLinux	11.220606	2022-06-22	Official ISO	12.231120 (latest)
Ubuntu	16.04 LTS	2016-04-25	Community ISO	As Ubuntu Budgie
Universal Blue	38	2023-04-23	Official ISO	
Ultramarine Linux	35	2021-12-16	Official ISO	
Void Linux	Rolling	2016-10-09	Manual	

== Reception ==
Budgie has been generally well received, with reviews noting its appealing visual design and intuitive layout. Bertel King wrote in 2018 that "Budgie feels like someone took the great things about GNOME, took out all the not so great things, set some great default options, and sent that out into the world." However, King also considered this a negative, writing that Budgie "can feel more like a customized version of GNOME than a separate entity." John Perkins described Budgie as "a beautiful desktop that aims to provide sane defaults and a beautiful interface," while lamenting its limited availability on distributions other than Solus.

== Gallery ==
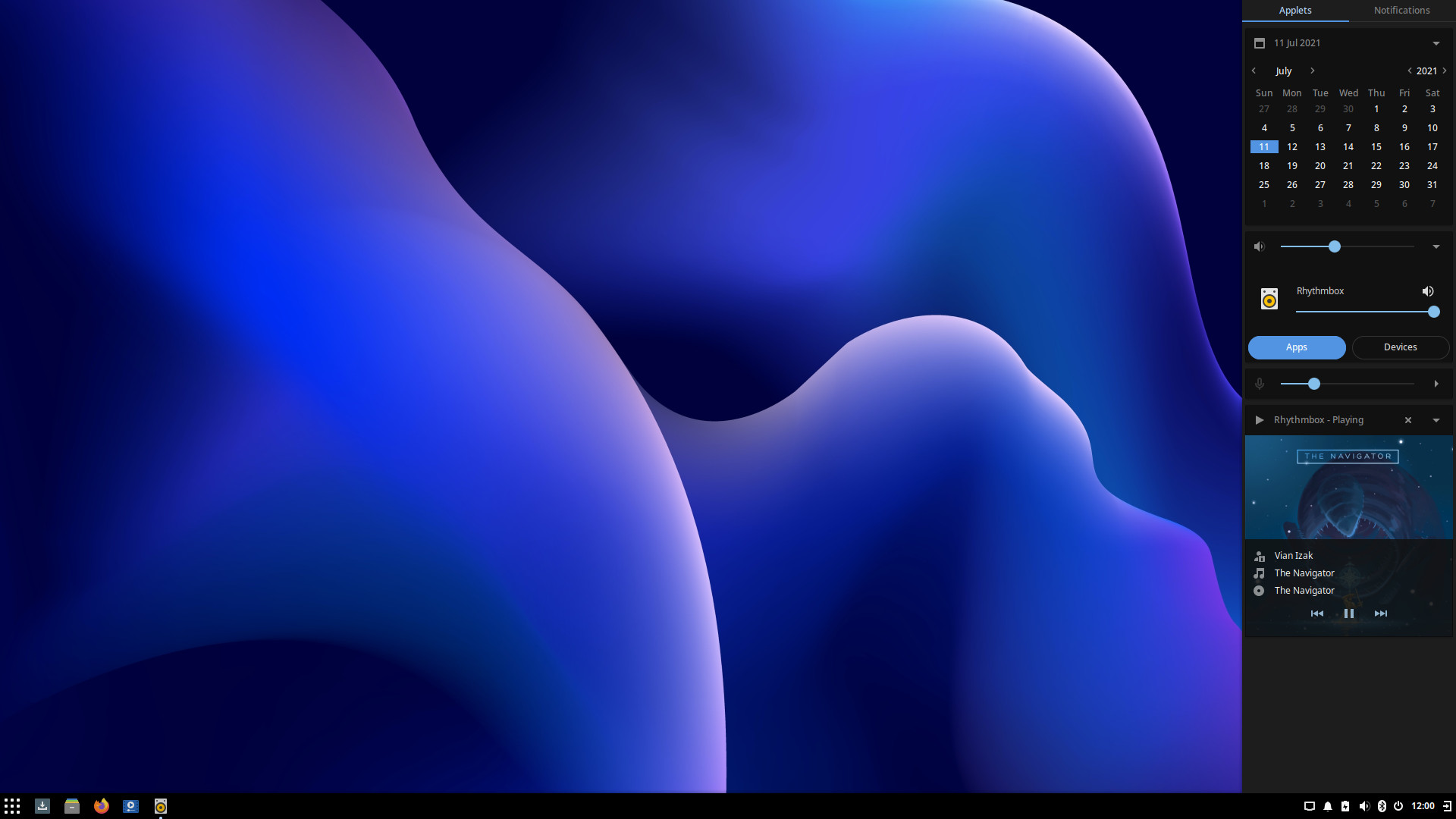
The Budgie Edition of Solus 4.3, showing Budgie v10.5.3 with the Raven sidebar expanded to show the Applets view.

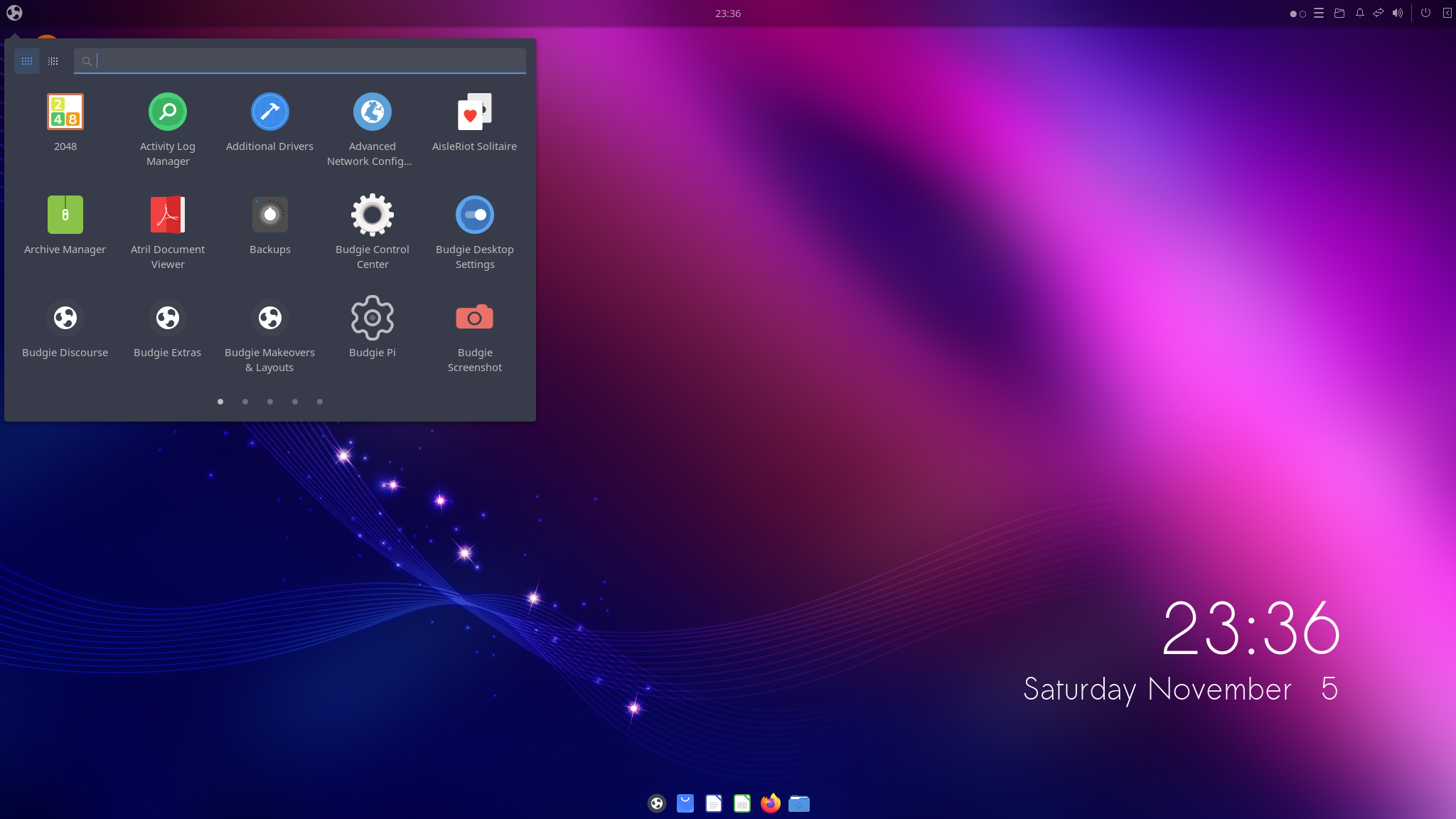
Ubuntu Budgie 22.10 showing a heavily customized Budgie v10.6, with the custom application menu expanded.

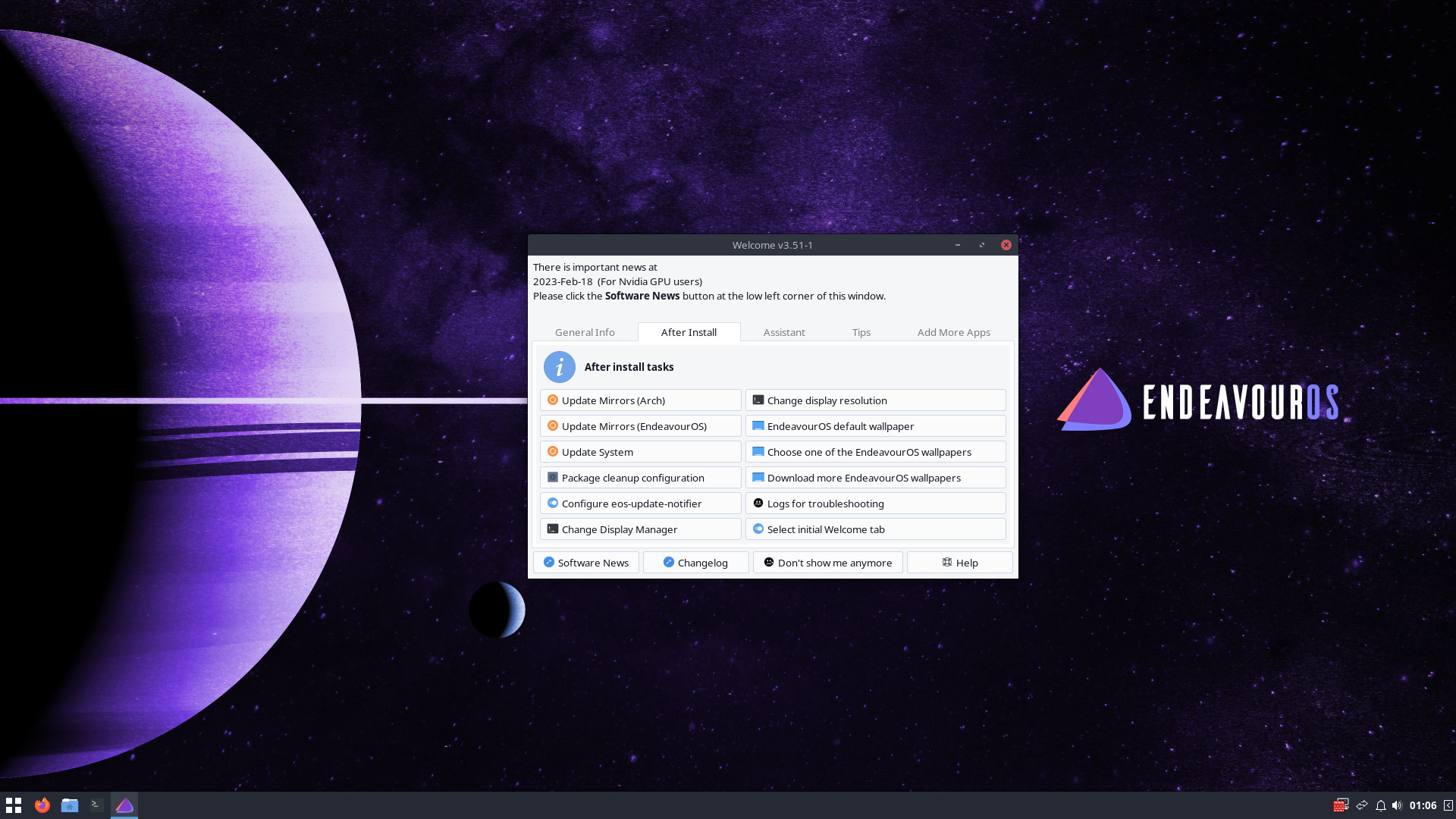
The Budgie profile of EndeavourOS Cassini Neo, showing Budgie v10.7.1 with the EndeavourOS Welcome application shown in the center of the screen.

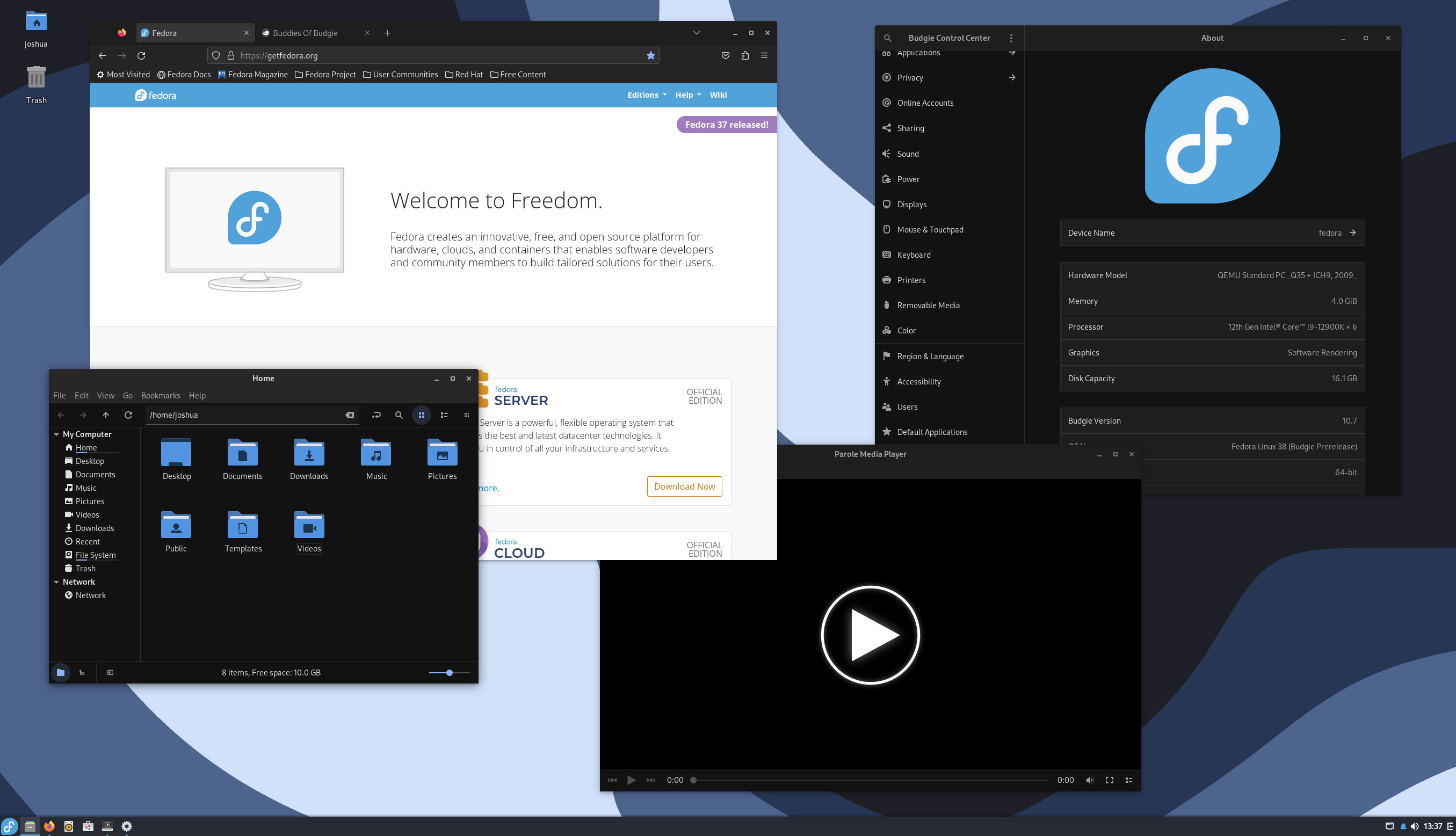
The beta version of the Fedora Budgie spin arriving in Fedora 38, showing Budgie v10.7.1 with desktop icons enabled and several application windows on the desktop.

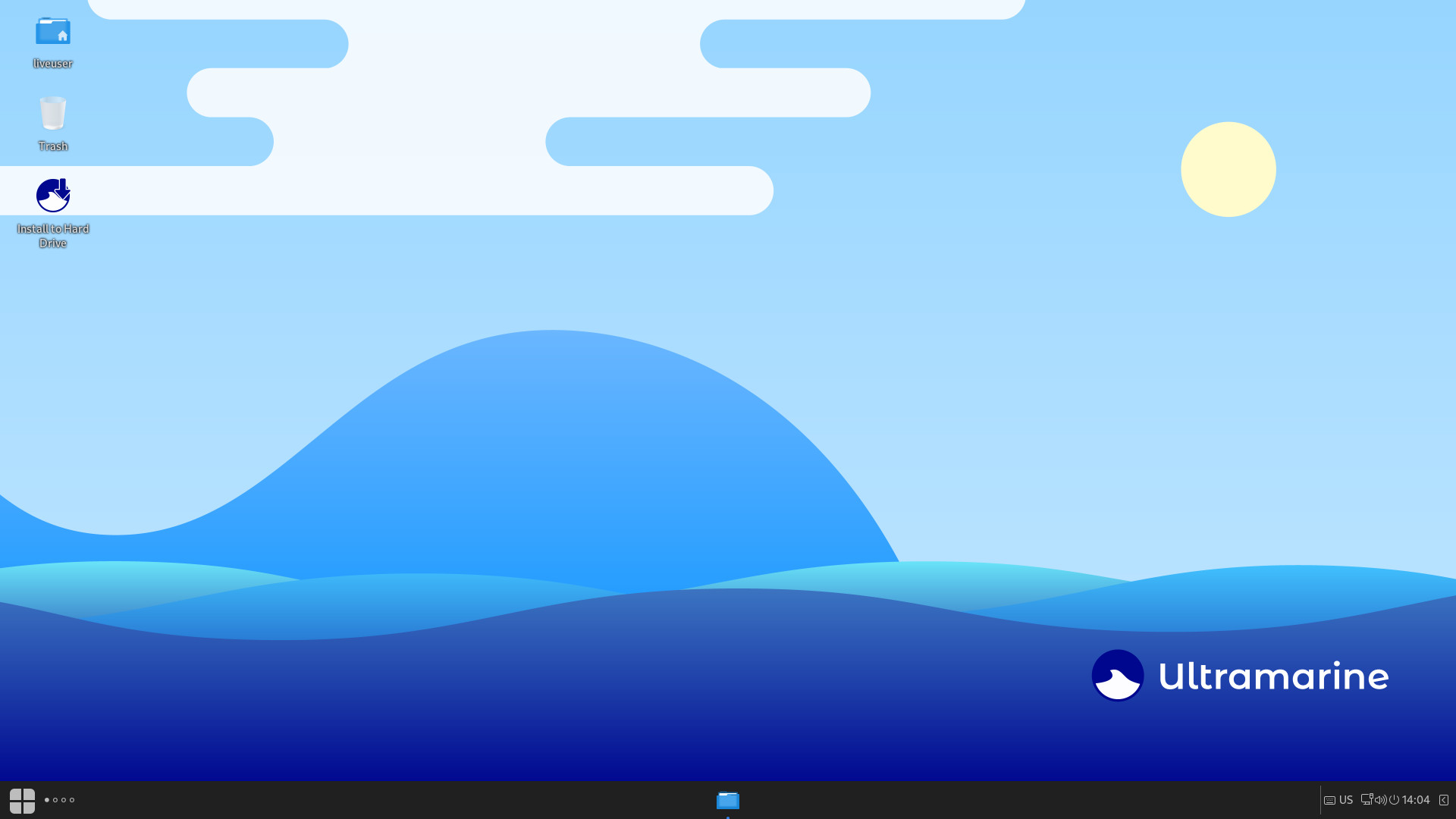
Budgie on Ultramarine Linux 37, showing Budgie v10.7.1 with desktop icons enabled and the Icon Task List moved to the center of the bottom panel.

== See also ==
- GNOME
- LXQt
- MATE (software)
- Cinnamon (desktop environment)
- Solus (operating system)
