= Solus Project =

- Solus Operating System created by Solus Project and successor to:
  - SolusOS released May 9, 2012 and abandoned October 2013
- The Solus Project, a video game
