= BlankOn Linux =

Indonesian Linux distribution

- BlankOn Linux 26.09 "Sinambung" running the Praya desktop (2026)
- Developer: BlankOn Linux Community
- OS family: Linux (Unix-like)
- Working state: Active
- Source model: Open source
- Latest release: 26.09 "Sinambung" (rolling release) / 22 September 2026; 2 months ago
- Update method: APT
- Package manager: dpkg
- Supported platforms: x86-64 (amd64); ARM64 in progress
- Kernel type: Monolithic
- Default user interface: Praya (GNOME Shell extension)
- License: Mainly GPL
- Official website: blankonlinux.id (distribution) blankon.id (foundation)

BlankOn Linux is an Indonesian Linux distribution based on Debian, designed for the needs of general computer users in Indonesia. The project began in 2004 by the BlankOn Development Team with the support of the Indonesian Linux Mobilisation Foundation (Yayasan Penggerak Linux Indonesia, YPLI). Development paused after 2021, and in late 2025 a new group of developers revived the project. That step was reinforced in 2026 when the BlankOn Foundation was established to manage legal and financial support for the project on an ongoing basis.

Before the revival, the last stable release was BlankOn Linux 11.0 "Uluwatu" in 2018, while version 12.0 "Verbeek" circulated only as pre-release images from 2021. On 22 September 2026 the project released BlankOn Linux 26.09 "Sinambung". The release uses a rolling release scheme based on Debian unstable ("Sid"), in which every package passes through testing in a staging repository before it reaches users. The release also introduced Praya as the new default desktop, replacing Manokwari by means of a GNOME Shell extension.

== History ==
=== Early releases (2004–2018) ===
BlankOn Linux was initially led by YPLI, a non-profit organisation founded in 2004 to support the community of Linux and free software users in the country. Its first edition, BlankOn Linux 1.0 "Bianglala", was released on 10 February 2005. The early version was derived from Fedora Core and was condensed from four CD images into a single CD, complete with menus and documentation translated into Indonesian. For the second edition the developers moved the base to a Debian derivative. This was marked by BlankOn 2.0 "Konde" on 15 November 2007, which was built on Ubuntu 7.10 with sponsorship from UNESCO.

One of BlankOn Linux's defining features is Manokwari, a desktop environment built with HTML5, CSS3, and Vala, originally derived from the project's blankon-panel component. Manokwari became the default desktop environment with BlankOn 8.0 "Rote" in 2012. Development continued with version 9.0 "Suroboyo" (2014), when the distribution moved to a direct Debian base. In the same year the LinuxBSDos blog reviewed BlankOn Linux and noted that the system used GNOME 3 combined with the custom Manokwari desktop shell. The review marked growing attention from the international Linux press, which continued with coverage of the BlankOn X "Tambora" release on the Ubuntu Buzz blog, until version 11.0 "Uluwatu" was released on 2 May 2018.

=== Dormant period (2021–2025) ===
The project stalled when pre-release images of version 12.0 "Verbeek" appeared in 2021, starting with an alpha in April and continuing with a public beta in May. According to publications at the time, the version marked the transition from Manokwari to GNOME as well as the adoption of the Calamares installer framework. A stable version of that edition was never released, and development stopped entirely. The project's internal records confirm that the release repository was inactive for several years before the whole infrastructure was rebuilt from scratch.

=== Revival (2025–2026) ===
Discussion about reviving the project had been circulating within the community throughout 2025, prompted by a meeting of long-time contributors at OpenInfra Days 2025. The idea was then announced publicly through the "BlankOn Revival Project" initiative. From November 2025 the remaining core team worked together to rebuild the project's foundations. Their main focus was repairing the infrastructure and redesigning the system architecture together with technical contributors, while opening the door to new volunteers. Not only were the package repositories and the ISO publishing server rebuilt, but the IRGSH build system was also reactivated after being rewritten in Go. The effort received support from corporate sponsors and individual donors who provided hardware, bandwidth, server colocation, and the domain name. The work paid off when the packaging process became reproducible around August 2026, allowing the repository to be rebuilt entirely from a documented package list.

At its peak, on 1 January 2026, the first system image that could be run and built independently through the internal repository (synced with Debian Sid) was produced. The progress was also highlighted by the LinuxLinks blog in March 2026, which reported that the new team had revived BlankOn's infrastructure and published the first image built with IRGSH. Praya was then introduced on 22 January 2026 as the GNOME Shell extension succeeding Manokwari. Shortly afterwards, on 7 February 2026, the BlankOn Foundation became a legal entity with a board made up of senior contributors and community members. The foundation focuses on providing operational support, while the BlankOn Linux project remains independent.

As tangible proof of the revival, BlankOn Linux 26.09 "Sinambung", the first rolling release, was published for the amd64 architecture on 22 September 2026. The release was preceded by a release candidate on 12 September 2026, which marked the completion of the revival phase. As a maintenance commitment, the developers published the first update wave on 10 October 2026 to deliver security fixes.

== Name and purpose ==
The BlankOn emblem, used on the project's website and documentation

Although the name BlankOn is often associated with the blangkon, the traditional headgear of the Javanese people, the project's official site states that the name does not come from it. Literally, BlankOn combines blank (representing the binary digit 0) and on (the binary digit 1), meaning a "digital hat" with a classic appearance. The name also represents the transformation from a blank (empty) state to on (filled or switched on). The philosophy carries the hope that users who were previously unaware become conscious of the potential of Linux and free and open-source software to improve competitiveness in information technology. The official mascot is named Boni, depicted wearing a blangkon-shaped helmet with a modern design.

At its beginning the distribution was designed for educational institutions as well as small and medium enterprises in Indonesia, emphasising ease of use without complicated configuration. Reviews in the technology press at the time placed BlankOn Linux as an operating system for general users with priority segments in education, offices, and government agencies. The project's internal documentation sets out two equally weighted missions: developing the capacity of the contributors involved, while maintaining a sustainable product for its users.

Under the new rolling release scheme the distribution uses the name "Sinambung", derived from the Indonesian word for "continuous", indicating that the system no longer changes its name with every update. The name "Verbeek" is now reserved for the installation image that is currently active.

== Specifications ==
BlankOn Linux follows Debian unstable ("Sid") as a rolling release: instead of periodic version upgrades, users receive new packages that have been tested in stages. The installation images are updated regularly without replacing older versions, so an installed system does not need to be reinstalled to obtain the latest version. According to the project's notes, the approach aims to deliver the latest Debian Sid packages without carrying the risk of instability. The developers therefore call the staging repository that guards this process "Seatbelt". The user interface relies on the GNOME desktop environment enhanced with the Praya extension. Installation runs from a live image using the Calamares installer, while software management is handled by APT and dpkg on the official amd64 image. The 26.09 image is distributed as an ISO file written to a USB drive of at least 4 GB, and Secure Boot must be disabled in the firmware during installation. An image that has already been downloaded can be updated differentially with zsync from the Jahitan server, so only the changed parts are downloaded again.

== Repositories ==
BlankOn packages are distributed officially through the Arsip repository. Behind it, a development repository called Arsip-dev is synchronised periodically with Debian Sid; new packages are promoted to the main Arsip repository only after passing a suitability review. Meanwhile, ISO images are published centrally through a dedicated server named Jahitan. Security monitoring runs through security.blankonlinux.id, which tracks Debian security advisories; when the repository is synced directly with upstream, the project requires a backup and recovery plan.

The entire process of compiling and distributing packages to the repository is managed with IRGSH, the project's own build system, which serves as an all-in-one tool for building and maintaining a Debian-derived GNU/Linux distribution, covering packaging, repository management, image building, and release management. The latest edition of IRGSH is a rewrite in Go working with a distributed architecture. It consists of a coordinator, build workers, repository workers, and a command-line interface that lets maintainers update packages independently. The developers describe the mechanism as a guarded rolling release, in which a problematic package can be fixed directly through IRGSH, and every package pull is preceded by a file-system snapshot to make rollback easier if something goes wrong.

== Development ==
The release cycle is strictly divided into alpha, beta, and release candidate (RC) stages. When the RC stage begins, synchronisation of the development repository with Debian Sid is paused to prevent new packages from introducing regressions. Once the situation is confirmed stable, the development repository is synchronised fully to the user repository. Contributors are grouped into three tiers: core contributors, mentees, and occasional contributors, and all of their activity is bound by a formal code of conduct. The project has also adopted a specific policy on the use of artificial intelligence in code contributions. The working structure of the project is currently divided into research and development, infrastructure, package maintenance, and public relations functions.

== Organisation ==
Structurally, the technical operation of BlankOn Linux is carried out by the BlankOn Linux project, while legal, funding, and administrative matters are handled by the BlankOn Foundation, a non-profit organisation established in February 2026 as the successor to YPLI's role. The foundation is a legal entity separate from the distribution project: this is visible in the different domains, where blankon.id serves as the foundation's portal while blankonlinux.id is dedicated to the operating system distribution. Its legal name is Yayasan BlankOn Penggiat Sumber Terbuka, entered in the Ministry of Law's register of foundations on 13 February 2026. Besides supporting BlankOn, the foundation also supports other open-source initiatives in Indonesia and publishes information about sponsors and financial reports openly.

=== Community and events ===
Whenever a new version is released, the BlankOn community often celebrates with "release parties" in major cities such as Jakarta, Yogyakarta, Bogor, and Surabaya. According to the project's public relations records, these events take the form of workshops, seminars, or training sessions presenting the latest features of BlankOn Linux and related open-source software projects. Between 2009 and 2012 the project held four national conferences called BlanKonf at universities and resort areas, alongside regular informal gatherings known as BlanKopdar. Their activities also appeared at large technology exhibitions, such as the Bekraf Habibie Festival in Jakarta in 2017 and 2018.

In recent years the project and the foundation have continued to build networks at national free and open-source software events, including Debian Day 2026 in Jakarta and Purbalingga and meetups of the Jakarta Linux Users Group. At the openSUSE.Asia Summit 2026 in Yogyakarta, openSUSE community members reported meeting the BlankOn Linux team to discuss techniques for building custom distribution images with the Open Build Service.

=== Building contributors ===
In line with its founding principles, developing the capacity of the people involved is one of BlankOn's main pillars. That spirit gave rise to the project's nickname as a "people factory". The track record of alumni contributors is recorded in the Kilas Balik Pengembang interview series, published periodically since 2020. Recruitment of new contributors has also been carried out through technical training; one example was in September 2017, when the infrastructure team held a Linux system administration workshop in Surabaya to attract new system administrators. Today the active work of the user and developer community can be followed openly on the BlankOn Linux Telegram channel. The project's impact has also spread to other ecosystems: the Manokwari desktop environment, developed by BlankOn from 2011, could later be installed on Ubuntu and Fedora through a community repository set up by former BlankOn developers with outside contributors. The desktop innovation also drew attention and praise from the international Linux press in 2017.

BlankOn is not a CD factory, not a package factory, but a people factory. People come into BlankOn, are forged in BlankOn, and leave sharper.
— A long-time BlankOn contributor, in the Kilas Balik Pengembang interview series, 2020 (translated from Indonesian)

== Version history ==
Releases 1.0 to 11.0 spanned 2005 to 2018. Codename naming used Indonesian words or place names, mostly taken in alphabetical order. In the current rolling release era, the alphabetical sequence continues for naming installation images (installer images), rather than marking a single release name.

Version	Codename	Release date	Notes
1.0	Bianglala	10 February 2005	First release, distributed on a single CD
2.0	Konde	15 November 2007	Sponsored by UNESCO
3.0	Lontara	27 April 2008	
4.0	Meuligoe	15 November 2008	
5.0	Nanggar	16 June 2009	
6.0	Ombilin	4 July 2010	
7.0	Pattimura	17 August 2011	
8.0	Rote	17 August 2012	Manokwari becomes the default desktop
9.0	Suroboyo	15 February 2014	Directly based on Debian
10.0	Tambora	20 May 2015	
11.0	Uluwatu	2 May 2018	Last stable release before the revival
12.0	Verbeek	2021 (pre-release)	Pre-release only; never shipped as stable
26.09	Sinambung	22 September 2026	Rolling release; ISO codename "Verbeek"

== Gallery ==
Booting BlankOn Linux 3 "Lontara"

Firefox running on BlankOn Lontara

BlankOn Linux 6 "Ombilin"

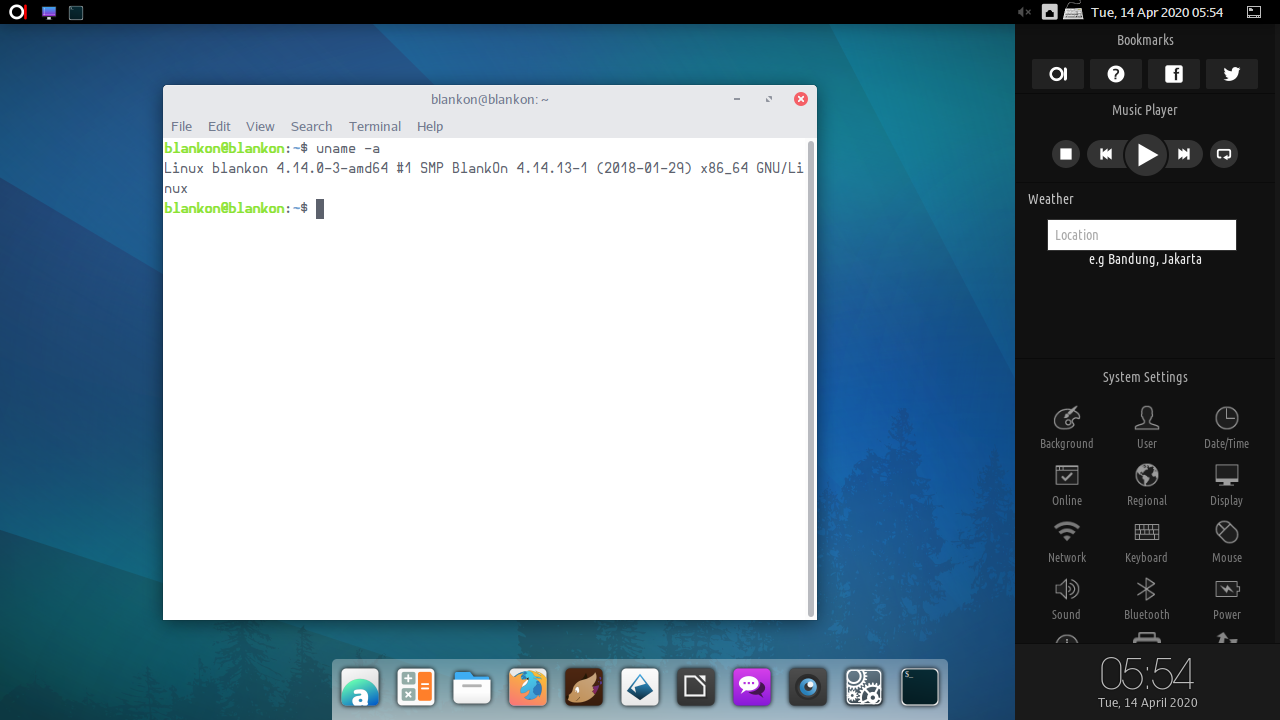
BlankOn Linux 11 "Uluwatu" with a terminal

== See also ==
- Debian
- List of Linux distributions
