= Maintenance release =

Fran

A maintenance release (also minor release or Maintenance Pack or MP) is a release of a product that does not add new features or content. For instance, in computer software, maintenance releases are typically intended to solve minor problems, typically "bugs" or security issues. Google, for instance, planned to halve its maintenance release times, to biweekly, commencing September 8, 2026, to enhance enterprise user security.

== Example of minor version numbering ==
The somewhat unusual version number "3.0.5a" was used for a minor release of KDE due to a lack of version numbers. Work on KDE 3.1 had already started and, up to that day, the release coordinator used version numbers such as 3.0.5, 3.0.6 internally in the main CVS repository to mark snapshots of the upcoming 3.1. Then, after 3.0.3, a number of important and unexpected bug fixes (starting from 3.0.4) suddenly became necessary, leading to a conflict, since 3.0.5 was, at this time, already in use. More recent KDE release cycles have tagged pre-release snapshots with large revision numbers, such as 3.1.95, to avoid such conflicts.

== See also ==
- Patch (computing)
- Software versioning
- Software release life cycle
- Point release
