= Ubuntu Budgie =

Ubuntu operating system derivative using Budgie desktop environment

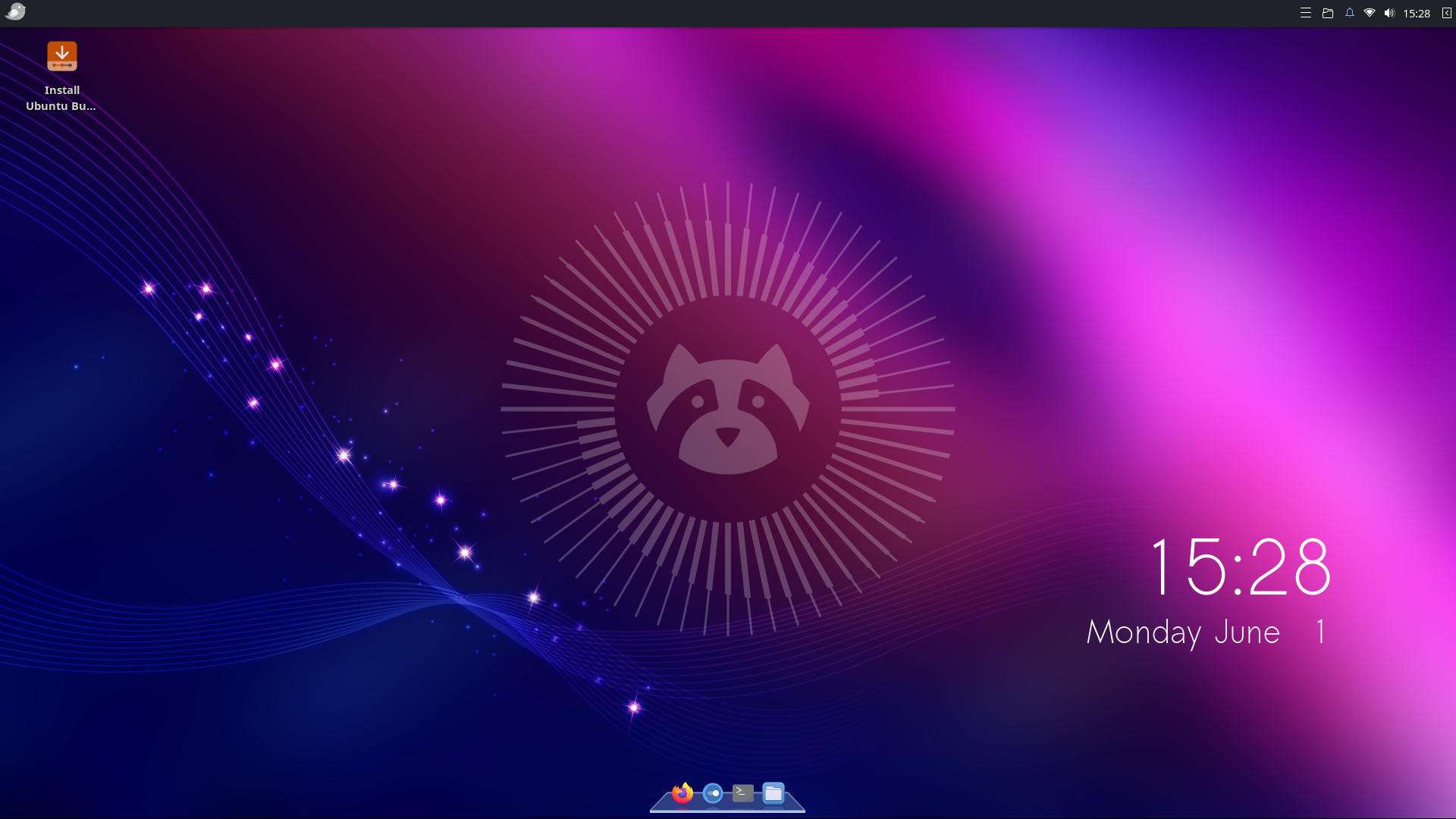
- Ubuntu Budgie 26.04 "Resolute Raccoon"
- Developer: Ubuntu Budgie Team
- OS family: Linux
- Working state: Current
- Source model: Open source, with exceptions
- Initial release: 25 April 2016 (10 years ago) as unofficial Ubuntu derivative; 16 November 2016 (9 years ago) as an official Ubuntu flavour
- Latest release: 25.10 "Questing Quokka" / 8 October 2025; 12 months ago
- Marketing target: Personal computers
- Update method: APT (Software Updater, GNOME Software)
- Package manager: dpkg, Snap
- Supported platforms: IA-32 (until version 18.04); x86-64
- Kernel type: Monolithic (Linux)
- Userland: GNU
- Default user interface: Budgie
- License: Free software licenses (mainly GPL)
- Official website: ubuntubudgie.org

Ubuntu Budgie is an official community flavor of Ubuntu. It combines an Ubuntu-based operating system with an independently developed graphical user interface-based desktop environment named Budgie.

== History ==
Ubuntu Budgie began as an unofficial community flavor in parallel with Ubuntu 16.04 long-term support (LTS), referred to as "budgie-remix". budgie-remix 16.10 was later released by strictly following the time frame issued for Ubuntu 16.10.

It was eventually recognized as an official community flavor of Ubuntu, and was rebranded as Ubuntu Budgie.

In November 2017, Vincenzo Bovino was hired as the new brand and public relations (PR) manager.

Ubuntu Budgie 17.04 was released in April 2017, and was updated to version 17.10 in October 2017.

32-bit support was deprecated from Ubuntu Budgie and Ubuntu MATE with version 18.10.

== Releases ==
Current release	Release no longer supported	Release still supported	Future release

Version	Codename	Release date	Supported until	Remarks	Kernel version
16.04 LTS	Xenial Xerus	25 Apr 2016	Aug 2018	First release, branded budgie-remix	4.10 (16.04.3)
16.10	Yakkety Yak	16 Oct 2016	20 Jul 2017		4.8
17.04	Zesty Zapus	11 Apr 2017	Jan 2018	First release after rename to Ubuntu Budgie following recognition as an official Ubuntu flavor	4.10
17.10	Artful Aardvark	19 Oct 2017	Jul 2018		4.13
17.10.1	Artful Aardvark	12 Jan 2018	Jul 2018	Re-release due to the original Ubuntu 17.10 ISO images getting pulled due to a bug that messed up some BIOSes	4.13
18.04 LTS	Bionic Beaver	26 Apr 2018	Apr 2021	First long-term support release as an official Ubuntu flavor	4.15
18.10	Cosmic Cuttlefish	18 Oct 2018	Jul 2019		4.18
19.04	Disco Dingo	18 Apr 2019	Jan 2020	Better graphics support with Mesa 19.0	5.0
19.10	Eoan Ermine	17 Oct 2019	Jul 2020		5.3
20.04 LTS	Focal Fossa	23 Apr 2020	Apr 2023		5.4
20.10	Groovy Gorilla	22 Oct 2020	Jul 2021		5.8
21.04	Hirsute Hippo	22 Apr 2021	Jan 2022		5.11
21.10	Impish Indri	14 Oct 2021	Jul 2022		5.13
22.04 LTS	Jammy Jellyfish	21 Apr 2022	Apr 2025		5.15
22.10	Kinetic Kudu	20 Oct 2022	Jul 2023		5.19
23.04	Lunar Lobster	11 Apr 2023	Jan 2024		6.2
23.10	Mantic Minotaur	12 Oct 2023	Jul 2024		6.5
24.04 LTS	Noble Numbat	25 Apr 2024	Apr 2027		6.8
24.10	Oracular Oriole	7 Oct 2024	Jul 2025		6.11
25.04	Plucky Puffin	15 Apr 2025	Jan 2026		6.14
25.10	Questing Quokka	8 Oct 2025	Jul 2026		6.17
26.04 LTS	Resolute Raccoon	23 Apr 2026	Apr 2029		7.0
26.10	Stonking Stingray	15 Oct 2026	July 2027		7.3

== See also ==
- List of Linux distributions
- Lubuntu
- Xubuntu
