= Ubuntu MATE =

Official flavor of Ubuntu with the MATE desktop environment

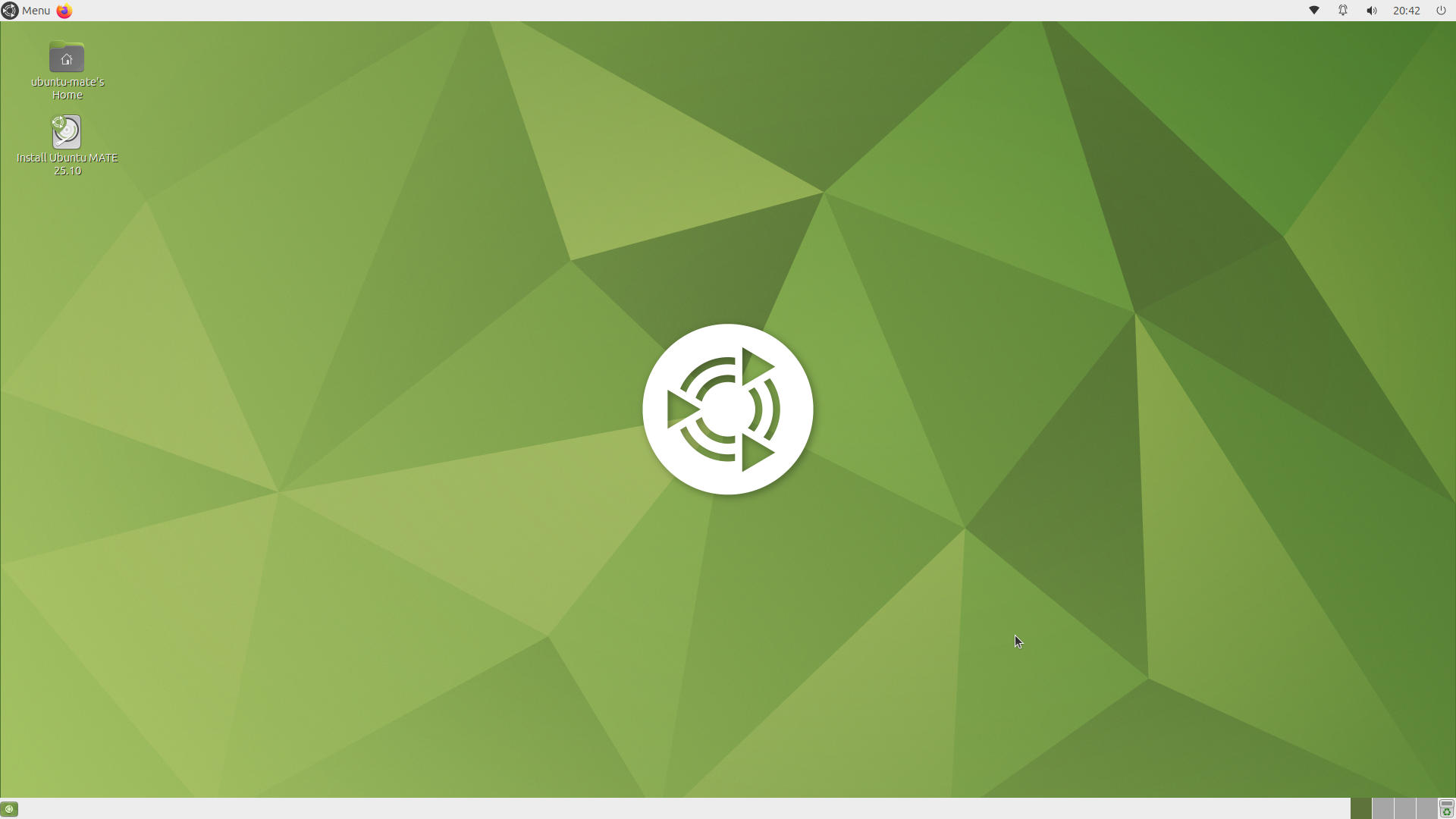
- Ubuntu MATE 25.10 "Questing Quokka"
- Developer: Ubuntu MATE team
- OS family: Linux (Unix-like)
- Working state: Current
- Source model: Open source
- Initial release: 23 October 2014; 11 years ago
- Latest release: 26.10 "Stonking Stingray" / 15 October 2026; 1 day ago
- Available in: Multilingual
- Update method: APT (Software Updater, Ubuntu Software Center)
- Package manager: dpkg
- Supported platforms: x86-64, PowerPC, ARM
- Kernel type: Monolithic
- Userland: GNU
- Default user interface: MATE
- License: Free software licenses (mainly GPL)
- Official website: ubuntu-mate.org

Ubuntu MATE is a free and open-source Linux distribution and an official derivative of Ubuntu. Its main differentiation from Ubuntu is that it uses the MATE desktop environment as its default user interface (based on GNOME 2), instead of the GNOME desktop environment that is the default user interface for Ubuntu.

== History ==
The Ubuntu MATE project was founded by Martin Wimpress and Alan Pope and began as an unofficial derivative of Ubuntu, using an Ubuntu 14.10 base for its first release; a 14.04 LTS release followed shortly. As of February 2015, Ubuntu MATE gained official Ubuntu flavour status from Canonical as per the release of 15.04 Beta 1. In addition to x86-64, Ubuntu MATE also supports PowerPC and ARMv7 (on the Raspberry Pi 2 and 3 as well as the ODROID XU4).

In April 2015, Ubuntu MATE announced a partnership with British computer reseller Entroware, enabling Entroware customers to purchase laptop and desktop computers with Ubuntu MATE preinstalled with full support. Several other hardware deals were announced later.

In Ubuntu MATE 18.10, 32-bit support was dropped.

== Releases ==
Current release	Release no longer supported	Release still supported	Future release	Unreleased

Version	Codename	Release date	Supported until	Remarks
14.04 LTS	Trusty Tahr	11 November 2014	April 2019	Released after the 14.10 release in order to provide long-term support until 2019, following Ubuntu.
14.10	Utopic Unicorn	23 October 2014	July 2015	First release of Ubuntu MATE.
15.04	Vivid Vervet	23 April 2015	January 2016	First release as an official Ubuntu flavour.
15.10	Wily Werewolf	22 October 2015	July 2016	Features MATE 1.10, Ubuntu Software Center not installed by default.
16.04 LTS	Xenial Xerus	21 April 2016	April 2019	First official LTS release; features MATE 1.12.x DE, expanded Welcome application and Software Boutique; has ZFS built-in by default.
16.10	Yakkety Yak	13 October 2016	July 2017	Full GTK3+ implementation of the MATE Desktop. Most default applications are "Recommended" and can thus be uninstalled without issue.
17.04	Zesty Zapus	13 April 2017	January 2018	Concluded the migration to GTK3+.
17.10	Artful Aardvark	19 October 2017	July 2018	17.10.1, was released on 12 January 2018. It fixed a problem that corrupted the UEFI & BIOS firmware.
18.04 LTS	Bionic Beaver	26 April 2018	April 2021	It includes support for GPD Pocket & Pocket 2, Raspberry Pi B2/B3/B3+.
18.10	Cosmic Cuttlefish	18 October 2018	July 2019	First non-LTS 64-bit-only release, end of 32-bit support. Features MATE 1.20.
19.04	Disco Dingo	18 April 2019	January 2020	Features MATE 1.20 and Nvidia drivers.
19.10	Eoan Ermine	17 October 2019	July 2020	Non-LTS 64-bit-only release. Features MATE 1.22.2 and replaces VLC media player with GNOME mpv as default media player software.
20.04 LTS	Focal Fossa	23 April 2020	April 2023	Features MATE 1.24.
20.10	Groovy Gorilla	22 October 2020	July 2021	Features MATE 1.24.1.
21.04	Hirsute Hippo	22 April 2021	January 2022	64-bit-only. Features MATE 1.24.2.
21.10	Impish Indri	14 October 2021	July 2022	Features MATE 1.26.
22.04 LTS	Jammy Jellyfish	21 April 2022	April 2027	Features MATE 1.26.1.
22.10	Kinetic Kudu	20 October 2022	July 2023	PipeWire replaces PulseAudio, and MATE 1.26.1 includes some backported features from the unreleased 1.28 version
23.04	Lunar Lobster	20 April 2023	January 2024	
23.10	Mantic Minotaur	12 October 2023	July 2024	
24.04 LTS	Noble Numbat	25 April 2024	May 2029	Current LTS release.
24.10	Oracular Oriole	10 October 2024	July 2025	
25.04	Plucky Puffin	17 April 2025	January 2026	
25.10	Questing Quokka	7 October 2025	July 2026	
26.04 LTS	Resolute Raccoon	N/A	N/A	Unreleased.
26.10	Stonking Stingray	15 October 2026	July 2027	Current interim release.

== Reception ==
In a May 2016 review Jesse Smith of DistroWatch concluded, "despite my initial problems getting Ubuntu MATE installed and running smoothly, I came away with a positive view of the distribution. The project is providing a very friendly desktop experience that requires few hardware resources by modern standards. I also want to tip my hat to the default theme used on Ubuntu MATE."

Dedoimedo reviewed Ubuntu MATE in July 2018, and wrote that "[Ubuntu MATE offers] a wealth of visual and functional changes…You really have the ability to implement anything and everything, and all of it natively, from within the system's interface".

Starting with the 22.04 LTS release, Ubuntu MATE included AI-generated wallpapers. These were warmly received by popular tech blogs, with OMG! Ubuntu exclaiming "I'm blown away by the quality of this AI-produced artwork" for the 22.04 release, and IT's FOSS News proclaiming the "beautiful" wallpapers were "a big highlight" of the 22.10 release".

== See also ==
- Comparison of Linux distributions
- GTK
- Linux Mint
- MATE
- Ubuntu Budgie
- Ubuntu Unity
- Xubuntu
