= SparkyLinux =

Lightweight Linux distribution

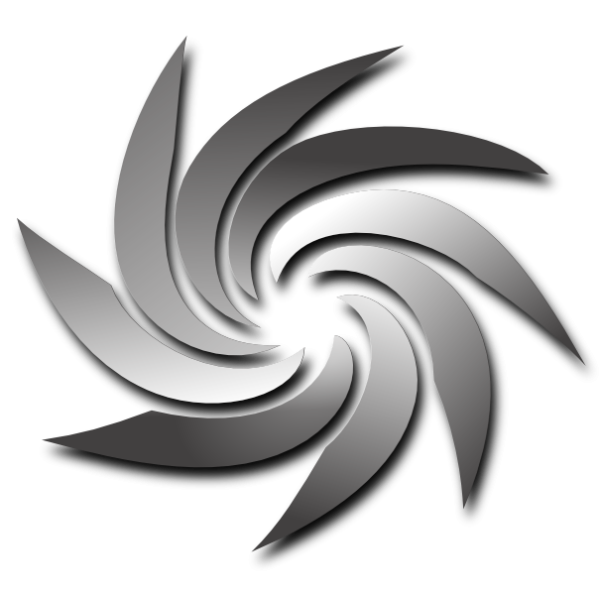

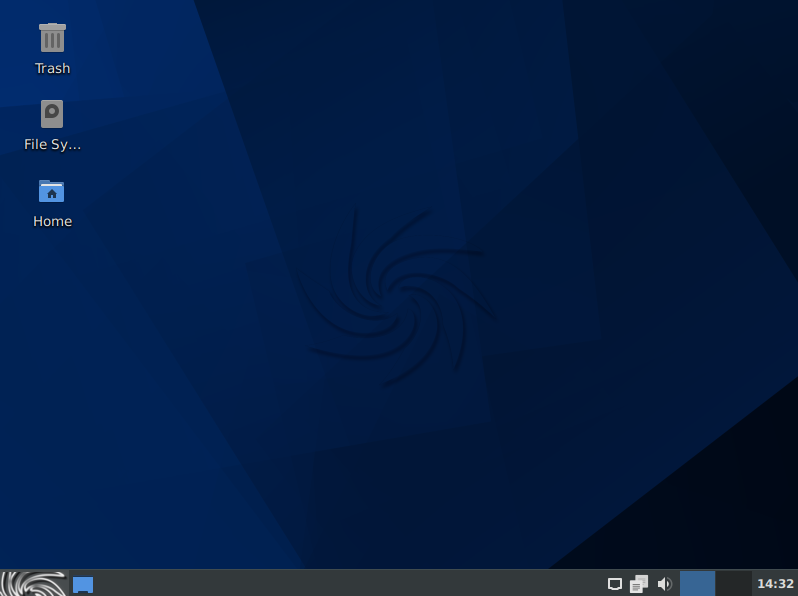
- SparkyLinux 6.0 "Po Tolo" with Xfce
- Developer: SparkyLinux team
- OS family: Linux (Unix-like)
- Working state: Current
- Source model: Open source
- Initial release: 5 May 2012; 14 years ago
- Latest release: 8.2 / 16 February 2026; 4 months ago
- Available in: Multilingual
- Update method: APT (front-ends available)
- Package manager: dpkg (front-ends available)
- Supported platforms: IA-32, x86-64, ARM
- Kernel type: Monolithic (Linux)
- Userland: GNU
- Default user interface: LXQt, MATE, Xfce and KDE
- License: Mainly GPL and other free software licenses, minor additions of proprietary
- Official website: sparkylinux.org

SparkyLinux is a desktop-oriented operating system based on the Debian operating system. The project offers a ready-to-use operating system with various desktops to choose from. SparkyLinux is released 3-4 times per year to provide the latest versions of all applications.

== History ==
The project was born in October 2011 as an Ubuntu remix with Enlightenment as the default desktop having the name ue17r (Ubuntu Enlightenment17 Remix). After a few months of testing, the base system was changed to Debian and renamed SparkyLinux.

== Features ==
SparkyLinux has two main "flavors": the "stable flavor", which is based on the latest Debian stable, and the “rolling flavor”, which is based on the testing (next stable) branch of Debian and uses a (semi-)rolling-release cycle. Additionally, it includes a collection of tools and scripts to help users with easy administration of the system.

The default desktop environments are LXQt (formerly LXDE), MATE, Xfce, and KDE, but users can install other desktops via 'Sparky APTus'.

As Sparky ISO image features a few proprietary packages, the 'Sparky APTus' provides a small tool called 'Non-Free Remover' which can easily uninstall all 'contrib' and 'non-free' packages from the system.

Since 2023, the project has offered storage persistence from a utility that writes USB disk images. The feature so far only works on the MinimalGUI version of SparkyLinux.

== Special editions ==
- GameOver Edition, targeted to gamers. It features a large set of free and open-source games and some needed tools.
- Rescue Edition, provides a live system and a large number of applications for recovering broken operating systems.
- Multimedia for audio, video, and HTML pages editing.
- MinimalCLI and MinimalGUI.

== Releases and reception ==
- SparkyLinux 1.0 – codename “Venus” was renamed from ue17r to SparkyLinux 1.0 on January 15, 2012.
- SparkyLinux 2.0 – codename “Eris” was released on December 19, 2012.
- SparkyLinux 3.0 – codename “Annagerman” was released on July 27, 2013.
- SparkyLinux 3.4 – codename “Annagerman” was released on June 03, 2014.
- SparkyLinux 3.5 – codename “Annagerman” was released on September 06, 2014.
- SparkyLinux 4.0 – codename “Tyche” was released on June 26, 2015.
- SparkyLinux 5.0 – codename “Nibiru” was released on July 17, 2017.
- SparkyLinux 5.5 – codename “Nibiru” was released on July 27, 2018.
- SparkyLinux 6.0 – codename “Po Tolo” was released on August 20, 2021.
- SparkyLinux 7.0 – codename “Orion Belt” was released on June 15, 2023.
- SparkyLinux 8.0 – codename “The Seven Sisters” was released on August 14, 2025.
- SparkyLinux 9.0 – code name “Tiamat” (based on Debian 14 “Forky”) is in beta testing.

== See also ==
- List of live CDs
