= Black dog =

Black dog or blackdog may refer to:

== Arts and entertainment ==
=== Fictional entities ===
- Black Dog, a bio-robot in the 1982 Bulgarian animated science fiction film The Treasure Planet
- The Black Dog, an inn in 2015–2016 British drama TV series The Coroner
- Black Dog, a pirate in Robert Louis Stevenson's Treasure Island
- Black Dogs, a group of students in the Boarding School Juliet manga series

=== Film and television ===
- The Black Dog, a 1987 animated short film by Alison de Vere
- Black Dog (1998 film), an American film
- Black Dog (2024 film), a Chinese film
- Black Dog: Being A Teacher, a 2019 South Korean television series
- "Black Dog", a 2002 episode of the American TV series That '70s Show (season 5)
- "Blackdog", a 2005 two-part episode of the British TV series The Commander season 2

=== Literature ===
- Black Dog (novel), by Stephen Booth, 2000
- Black Dogs, by Ian McEwan, 1992
- Black Dog, a children's book by Levi Pinfold, winner of the 2013 Kate Greenaway Medal
- "Black Dog", a short story by Neil Gaiman set in the American Gods world, 2015

=== Music ===
- The Black Dog (band), a pioneering British electronic music group
- "Black Dog", a song by Jesse Winchester, 1970
- "Black Dog" (Led Zeppelin song), by Led Zeppelin, 1971
- "Black Dog" (Arlo Parks song), 2020
- "Black Dog", a song by Poster Children from the 1997 album RTFM
- "Black Dogs!", a song by Genesis Owusu from the 2021 album Smiling with No Teeth
- Black Dog (album), 2023 album by Gazelle Twin
- "The Black Dog" (song), a song by Taylor Swift from the 2024 album The Tortured Poets Department
- "Perro Negro", 2023 single by Bad Bunny and Feid, translated to "Black Dog" in English

== Businesses and brands ==
- Black Dog Books (Australian publisher)
- Black Dog Books (American publisher)
- Black Dog & Leventhal Publishers, an American publisher
- Black Dog Publishing, a British publishing company
- Black Dog Institute, an Australian institute for the treatment of mood disorders such as depression
- Black Dog (whisky), by United Spirits Limited
- The Black Dog (restaurant), on Martha's Vineyard, Massachusetts, U.S.
- The Black Dog, Dublin, a former prison in Ireland
- Black Dog Salvage, a salvage company in the 2012–2020 American reality TV series Salvage Dawgs

== Places ==
- Black Dog, Devon, England
- Black Dog Lake, in Minnesota, U.S.
- Blackdog, Aberdeen, Scotland
- Black Dog Halt railway station, a former halt in Wiltshire, England

== Other uses ==
- Black dog (folklore), a spectral black dog from English folklore
- a dog with black fur
- Major depressive disorder (the term black dog was coined by Samuel Johnson and popularised by Winston Churchill)
- Black dog (coin), a coin in the Caribbean, starting under the reign of Queen Anne of Great Britain
- Black Dog (Osage chief) (1780–1848)
  - Black Dog II, son of Black Dog, a company commander of the Osage Battalion, an 1863–1865 Native American unit of the Confederate States Army
- BlackDog, a 2005 pocket-sized, self-contained computer

== See also ==
- Black dog syndrome, a tendency for black dogs not to be adopted from animal shelters
- Anubis, an ancient Egyptian god, depicted as a black canine or a man with a black canine head
- Hellhound, a supernatural dog in folklore
