= Xbox Linux =

Linux distribution for Xbox consoles

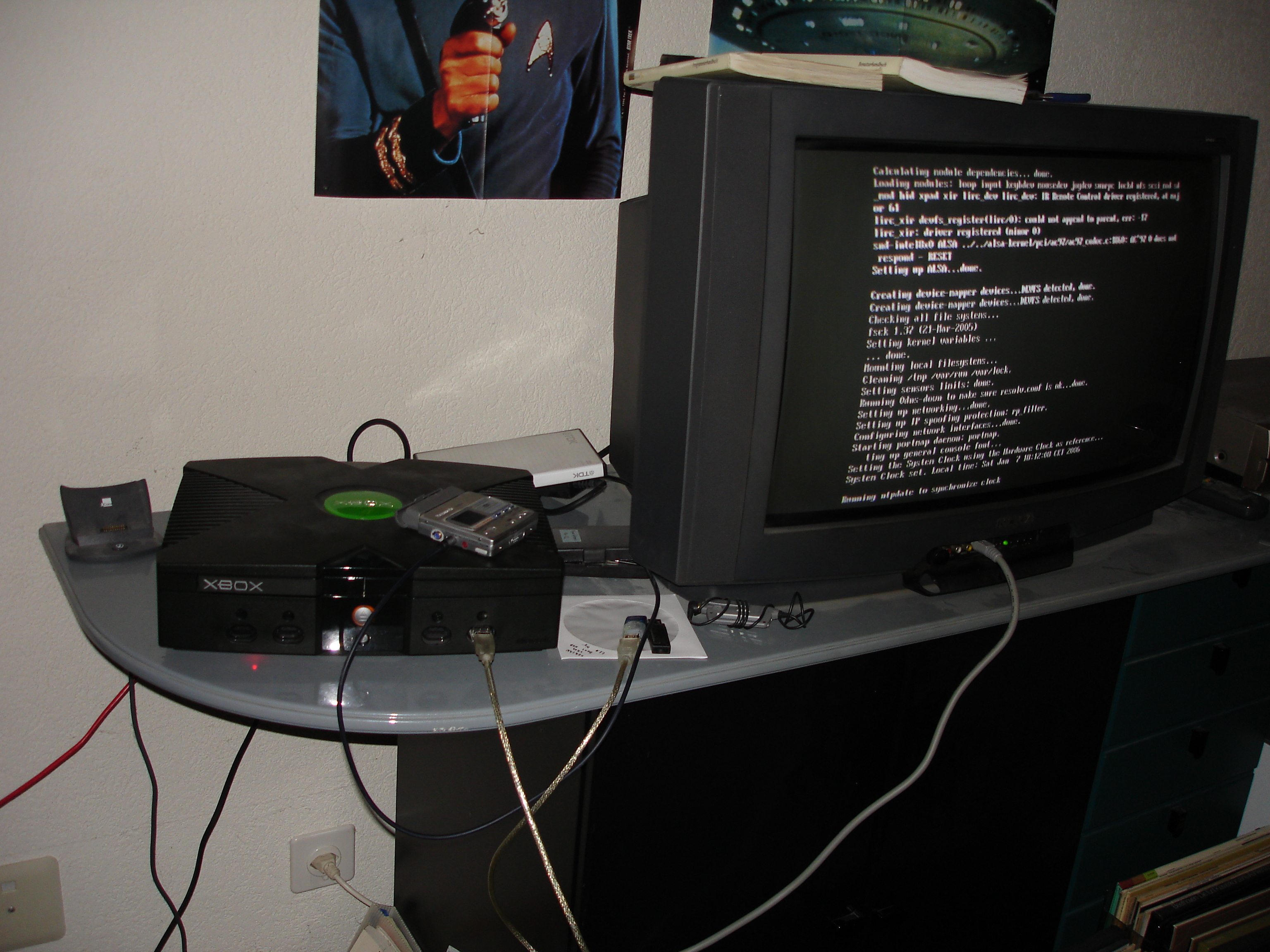
Xbox Linux booting

Xbox Linux was a project that ported the Linux operating system to the Xbox video game console. Because the Xbox uses a digital signature system to prevent the public from running unsigned code, one must either use a modchip, or a softmod. Originally, modchips were the only option; however, it was later demonstrated that the TSOP chip on which the Xbox's BIOS is held may be reflashed. This way, one may flash on the "Cromwell" BIOS, which was developed by the Xbox Linux project. Catalyzed by a large cash prize for the first team to provide the possibility of booting Linux on an Xbox without the need of a hardware hack, numerous software-only hacks were also found. For example, a buffer overflow was found in the game 007: Agent Under Fire that allowed the booting of a Linux loader ("xbeboot") straight from a save game.

The Xbox is essentially a PC with a custom 733 MHz Intel Pentium III processor, a 10 GB hard drive (8 GB of which is accessible to the user), 64MB of RAM (although on all earlier boxes this is upgradeable to 128MB), and 4 USB ports. (The controller ports are actually USB 1.1 ports with a modified connector.) These specifications are enough to run several readily available Linux distributions.

From the Xbox-Linux home page:

The Xbox is a legacy-free PC by Microsoft that consists of an Intel Celeron 733 MHz CPU, an nVidia GeForce 3MX, 64 MB of RAM, a 8/10 GB hard disk, a DVD drive and 10/100 Ethernet. As on every PC, you can run Linux on it.

An Xbox with Linux can be a full desktop computer with mouse and keyboard, a web/email box connected to TV, a server or router or a node in a cluster. You can either dual-boot or use Linux only; in the latter case, you can replace both IDE devices. And yes, you can connect the Xbox to a VGA monitor.

== Uses ==
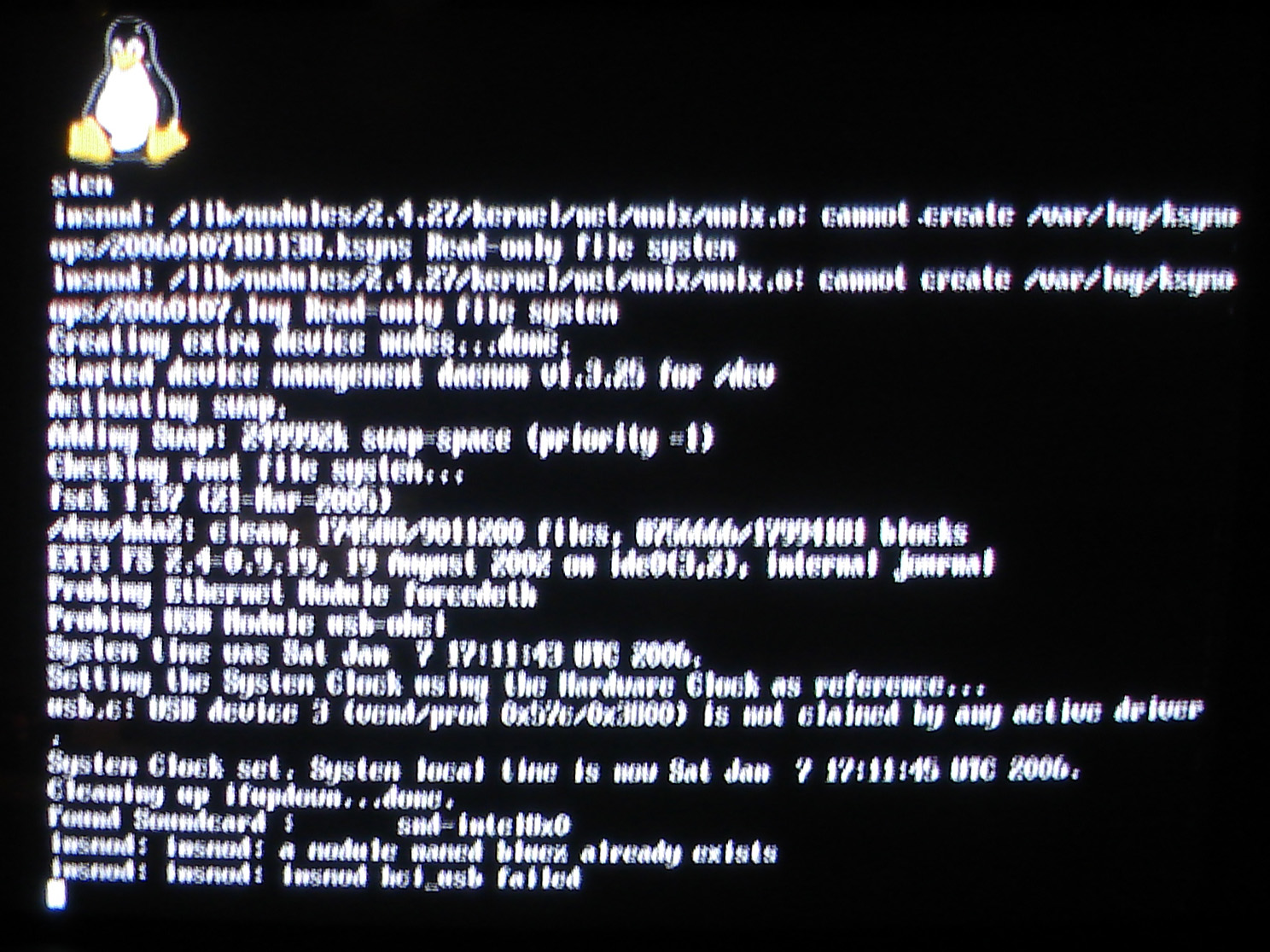
Xebian Booting

An Xbox with Linux installed can act as a full desktop computer with mouse and keyboard, a web/email box connected to a television, a server, router or a node in a cluster. One can either dual-boot or use Linux only; in the latter case, one can replace both IDE devices. One can also connect the Xbox to a VGA monitor. A converter is needed to use keyboards/mice in the controller ports; however this is not difficult, as the Xbox uses standard USB with a proprietary port.

Currently only a few distributions of Xbox Linux will run on the version 1.6 Xbox (the third newest version, including 1.6b). Xboxes with modchips and the Cromwell BIOS installed can run more distributions than those with only a softmod. This is mainly due to issues with the video chip used in version 1.6 Xboxes that was developed exclusively by Microsoft and which has no source code available at this time. This can cause significant overscan on all four sides of the screen when a different kernel than the original is loaded.

== Softmod ==
One of the more popular ways of installing Xbox Linux is through a softmod, which does not require a modchip to use. The Xbox Linux softmod utilizes a save exploit found in the original run of MechAssault, Splinter Cell, 007: Agent Under Fire, and Tony Hawk's Pro Skater 4. The method involves loading a hacked save file transferred to the Xbox's Hard Drive. When the save file is loaded, the MechInstaller is initiated. The Xbox Live option on the dashboard is replaced with the new Linux option after rebooting the system. Another softmod that can be used is the hotswap exploit which will unlock the Xbox hard drive long enough to allow one to modify it.

There is also a way to completely replace the Xbox's stock BIOS with a "Cromwell" BIOS, which is completely legal and is solely for Linux on the Xbox. However, once the TSOP (BIOS chip) is flashed with "Cromwell", the Xbox can no longer play Xbox games or run native Xbox executables (.xbe files, akin to .exe for Windows).

== List of distributions ==
There are several distributions of Xbox Linux, most of which are based on PC Linux distributions.

| Distribution | Description |
|---|---|
| Xebian/Ed's Debian | An Xbox Linux distribution that can install to the Xbox hard drive, or start a live session. A MythTV frontend can be run under Xebian and connect to a separate backend. |
| Gentoox | A Gentoo-based distribution, which features the "magic" updater, which allows users to download Xbox-specified packages and updates. |
| X-DSL | A distribution based on Damn Small Linux. |

== Threatening incident against Microsoft ==
In June 2003, an Australian hacker group threatened that if Microsoft did not release a first-party, signed bootloader for Linux, they would release technology that would allow Linux (and pirated software, etc.) to run on the Xbox without a mod chip.

Microsoft never complied with the request, and the Xbox Linux project announced more details in July 2003.

== See also ==
- Free60
- Linux for PlayStation 2
- OtherOS
