= Black Dog Lake =

Lake in the state of Minnesota, United States

- Concrete dam at east exit of Black Dog Lake, draining into Minnesota River.

- Location within Minnesota
- Location: Dakota County, Minnesota
- Coordinates: 44°48′19″N 93°15′50″W
- Type: lake

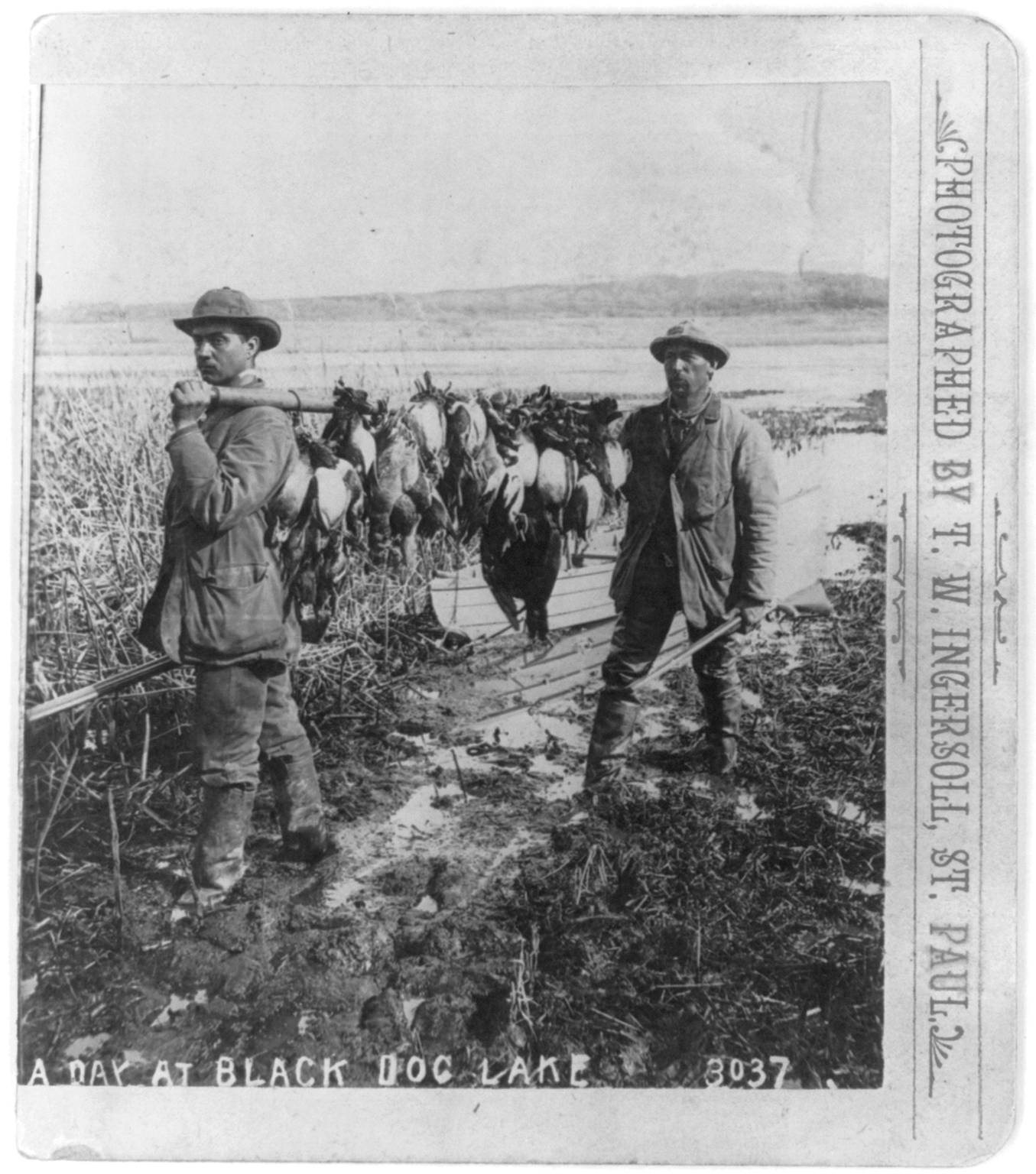
"A Day at Black Dog Lake" photograph by Truman Ward Ingersoll

Black Dog Lake is a lake in Dakota County, in the U.S. state of Minnesota.

The lake was named for Black Dog, a Sioux Indian.

Black Dog Lake has long been known for its rich biodiversity. It has been noted as "an excellent habitat for a variety of wildlife, including the Bald Eagle and American Golden Eagle", a "large wetland", one of "the greatest" near Interstate 35. Other birds seen on the Lake include loons and Pomarine jaeger. In 1982, the Northern States Power leased out the Lake's wildlife habitat as a protected area, for 50 years.

== See also ==
- List of lakes in Minnesota
