= Unicore =

Computer architecture

- Designer: Microprocessor Research and Development Center
- Bits: 32-bit
- Introduced: 1999
- Design: RISC
- Encoding: Fixed
- Branching: Condition code
- Endianness: Little
- Page size: 4 KiB

Registers
- General-purpose: 31
- Floating-point: 32

Unicore is a computer instruction set architecture designed by the Microprocessor Research and Development Center (MPRC) of Peking University in the PRC. The computer built on this architecture is called the Unity-863. The CPU is integrated into a fully functional SoC to make a PC-like system.

The processor is very similar to the ARM architecture, but uses a different instruction set.

It was supported by the Linux kernel starting from version 2.6.39; support was removed in Linux kernel version 5.9 as according to a developer "nobody seemed to maintain it and the code was falling behind the rest of the kernel code and compiler requirements".

== Instruction set ==
The instructions are almost identical to the standard ARM formats, except that conditional execution has been removed, and the bits reassigned to expand all the register specifiers to five bits. Likewise, the immediate format is nine bits rotated by a five-bit amount (rather than eight bit rotated by four), the load/store offset sizes are 14 bits for byte/word and ten bits for signed byte or half-word. Conditional moves are provided by encoding the condition in the (unused by ARM) second source register field Rn for MOV and MVN instructions.

Unicore32 instruction set overview
31	30	29	28	27	26	25	24	23	22	21	20	19	18	17	16	15	14	13	12	11	10	9	8	7	6	5	4	3	2	1	0	Description
0	0	0	opcode				S	Rn					Rd					shift					0	Sh		0	Rm					ALU operation, Rd = Rn op Rm shift #shift
0	0	0	opcode				S	Rn					Rd					Rs					0	Sh		1	Rm					ALU operation, Rd = Rn op Rm shift Rs
0	0	1	opcode				S	Rn					Rd					shift					imm9									ALU operation, Rd = Rn op #imm9 ROTL #shift
0	1	0	P	U	B	W	L	Rn					Rd					shift					0	Sh		0	Rm					Load/store Rd to address Rn ± Rm shift #shift
0	1	1	P	U	B	W	L	Rn					Rd					offset14														Load/store Rd to address Rn ± offset14
1	0	0	P	U	S	W	L	Rn					Bitmap high										0	0	H	Bitmap low						Load/store multiple registers
1	0	1	cond				L	offset24																								Branch (and link) if condition true
1	1	0																														Coprocessor (FPU) instructions
1	1	1	1	1	1	1	1	Trap number																								Software interrupt
0	0	0	0	0	0	A	S	Rn					Rd					Rs					1	0	0	1	Rm					Multiply, Rd = Rm * Rs (+ Rn)
0	0	0	1	0	0	0	L	11111					11111					00000					1	0	0	1	Rm					Branch and exchange (BX, BLX)
0	1	0	P	U	0	W	L	Rn					Rd					00000					1	S	H	1	Rm					Load/store Rd to address Rn ± Rm (16-bit)
0	1	0	P	U	1	W	L	Rn					Rd					imm_hi					1	S	H	1	imm_lo					Load/store Rd to address Rn ± #imm10 (16-bit)

The meaning of various flag bits (such as S=1 enables setting the condition codes) is identical to the ARM instruction set. The load/store multiple instruction can only access half of the register set, depending on the H bit. If H=0, the 16 bits indicate R0–R15; if H=1, R16–R31.
