= M32R =

Microcontroller architecture

- Designer: Renesas Electronics
- Bits: 32-bit
- Introduced: 1997
- Design: RISC
- Encoding: Fixed, 16- or 32-bit
- Endianness: Bi

Registers
- 16× 32-bit integer registers

The M32R is a 32-bit RISC instruction set architecture (ISA) developed by Mitsubishi Electric for embedded microprocessors and microcontrollers. The ISA is now owned by Renesas Electronics Corporation, and the company designs and fabricates M32R implementations. M32R processors are used in embedded systems such as Engine Control Units, digital cameras and PDAs. The ISA was supported by Linux and the GNU Compiler Collection but was dropped in Linux kernel version 4.16. GCC removed support for this architecture in the GCC 12.1 release.
