= Imagination META =

The META is a 32-bit multithreaded microprocessor developed by Metagence Technologies Division from Imagination Technologies. First version of META were developed in 2001 as META-1 multithreaded DSP core aimed for audio, radio and video processing. META HTP core family was announced in 2007 and is based on META-2 architecture. META is designed to support between one and four independent hardware threads, which typically operate concurrently on separate tasks. Despite the shared processing resources, each execution unit maintains a local register state, an execution pipeline, and a program counter (PC) for each thread to accommodate multiple thread contexts.

META family consists of Meta HTP applications processors (400–700 MHz on 65L – 65G process), META MTP Embedded Processors and Meta LTP Embedded Microcontrollers.

It is supported by the Linux kernel as of version 3.9.

In 2018 March, LWN.net reported that Imagination Technologies redirected its focus away from Meta after its purchase of MIPS Technologies in 2012. This has led to a proposal on Linux development mailing lists to remove support for the architecture from the kernel which became effective with the release of Linux 4.17 in June 2018.
