= List of NAS manufacturers =

The following notable companies manufacture Network-attached Storage devices.

Company	HQ Region	HQ Country	HQ City
Agami Systems	North America	United States	Sunnyvale, California
Apple Inc	North America	United States	Cupertino, California
AMAX Information Technologies	North America	United States	Fremont, California
Asus	Asia	Taiwan	Taipei
Asustor	Asia	Taiwan	Taipei
Avere Systems	North America	United States	Pittsburgh, Pennsylvania
BlueArc	North America	United States	Santa Clara, California
Buffalo	Asia	Japan	Nagoya, Aichi
Broadberry Data Systems	Europe	UK	London, England
Ciphertex Data Security	North America	United States	Chatsworth, California
Cisco Systems	North America	United States	San Francisco, California
Conceptronic	Europe	Netherlands	
CTERA Networks	North American and Middle East	United States and Israel	New York
Dane-Elec	Europe	France	
Data Robotics	North America	United States	San Jose, California
D-Link	Asia	Taiwan	Taipei
Dell	North America	United States	Round Rock, Texas
Drobo	North America	United States	San Jose, California
EMC Corporation	North America	United States	Hopkinton, Massachusetts, Round Rock, Texas
Exanet	Middle East	Israel	Raanana
eRacks	North America	United States	Orange, CA
eSys Technologies	Asia	Singapore	Singapore
Freecom	Europe	Germany	
Gluster	Asia	India & United States	Sunnyvale, California, Bangalore, India
HP	North America	United States	Palo Alto, California
Hitachi	Asia	Japan	Tokyo
Huawei	Asia	China	Shenzhen, China
IBM	North America	United States	Armonk, New York
Infortrend	Asia	Taiwan	New Taipei
Intel	North America	United States	Santa Clara, California
Iomega	North America	United States	San Diego, California
ioSafe	North America	United States	Roseville, California
Isilon	North America	United States	Hopkinton, Massachusetts
JetStor	North America	United States	Pittsburgh, Pennsylvania
Kitsune Computer	Europe	Spain	Madrid, Spain
LaCie	Europe	France	Paris
LG Electronics	Asia	South Korea	Seoul
Linksys	North America	United States	Irvine, California
Buffalo/Melco	Asia	Japan	Nagoya, Aichi
MPC Computers	North America	United States	Nampa, Idaho
NEC	Asia	Japan	Tokyo
Netgear	North America	United States	San Jose, California
NetApp	North America	United States	Sunnyvale, California
Nutanix	North America	United States	San Jose, California
Ocarina	North America	United States	San Jose, California
OpenMediaVault	Europe	Germany	
Oracle	North America	United States	Santa Clara, California
Panaro Tech	Asia	India	Coimbatore, Tamil Nadu
Philips	Europe	Netherlands	Netherlands
Pillar Data Systems	North America	United States	San Jose, California
Plextor	Asian	Japan and Taiwan	
PLX Technology	North America	United States	Sunnyvale, California
Promise Technology	Asia	Taiwan	Hsinchu
QNAP Systems	Asia	Taiwan	New Taipei City
Seagate/Maxtor	North America	United States	Cupertino, California
SGI	North America	United States	Mountain View, California
Supermicro	North America	United States	San Jose, California
Synology	Asia	Taiwan	Taipei
TEAC	Asia	Japan	Tokyo
TerraMaster	Asia	China	Shenzhen
Thecus	Asia	Taiwan	Taiwan
TrueNAS	North America	United States	San Jose, California
Ubiquiti	North America	United States	New York City
Ugreen	Asia	China	Shenzhen
USRobotics	North America	United States	Schaumburg, Illinois
VDURA	North America	United States	Sunnyvale, California
Western Digital	North America	United States	San Jose, California
Zadara Storage	North America	United States	Irvine, California
ZyXEL	Asia	Taiwan	Hsinchu
