= XigmaNAS =

Software

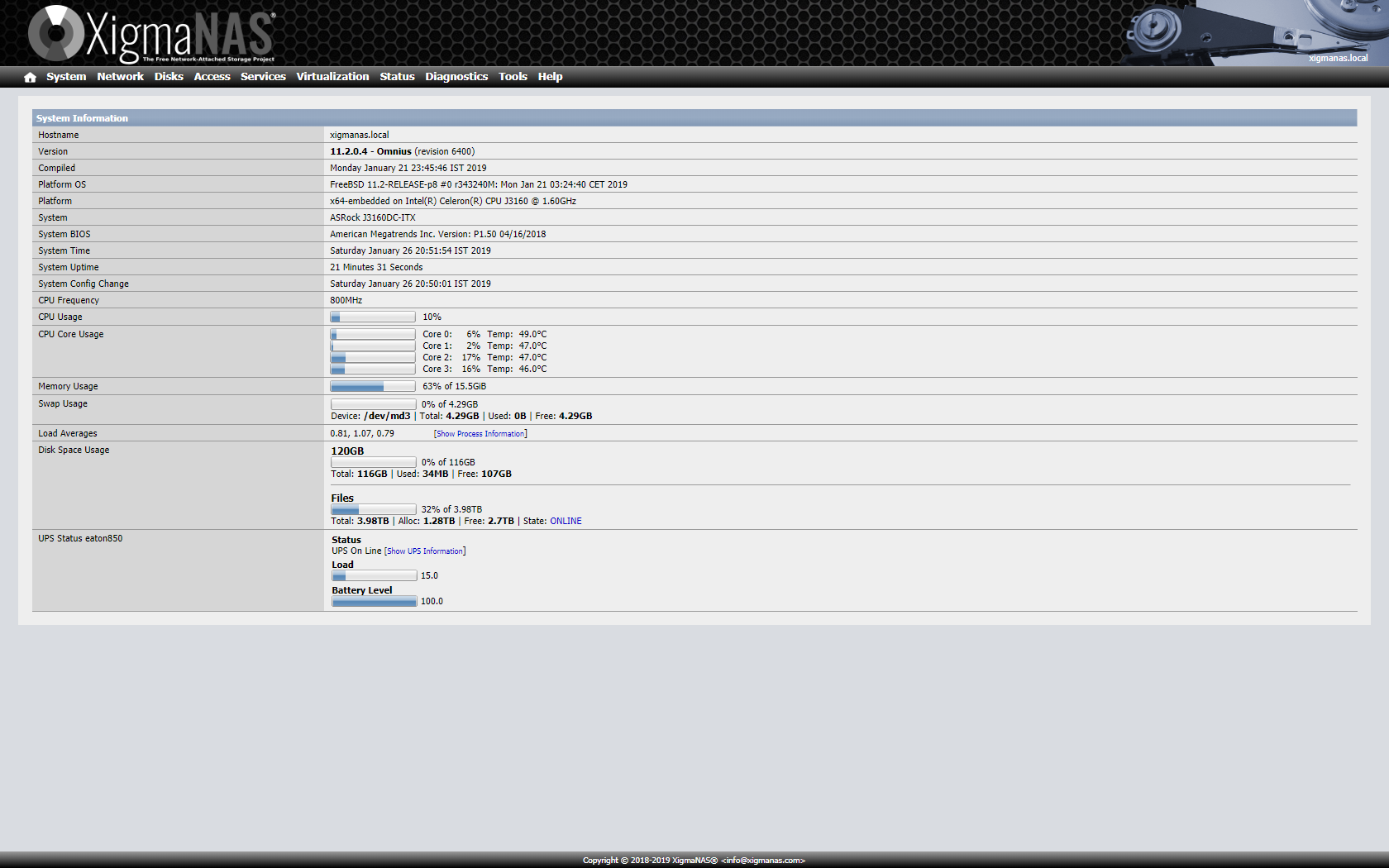
- Screenshot of XigmaNAS WebGUI
- Developers: The XigmaNAS Project: Michael Schneider; Michael Zoon
- Stable release: 14.3.0.5.10432 / 10 September 2025; 12 months ago
- Operating system: FreeBSD
- Platform: x64
- Available in: Czech; Dutch; English; French; German; Greek; Hebrew; Hungarian; Indonesian; Italian; Japanese; Korean; Latvian; Polish; Romanian; Russian; Serbian; Simplified Chinese; Slovak; Spanish; Turkish
- Type: Computer storage
- License: BSD license
- Website: www.xigmanas.org

XigmaNAS is an open-source network-attached storage (NAS) server software with a dedicated management web interface. It is a continuation of the original FreeNAS code, which was developed between 2005 and late 2011. It was released under the name NAS4Free on 22 March 2012. The name was changed to XigmaNAS in July 2018. On SourceForge, it was elected "'Community Choice' Project of the Month" twice, in August 2015 and March 2017.

== Technology ==
XigmaNAS is an embedded open-source NAS software distribution based on the latest release of FreeBSD. It is free software under the terms of the Simplified BSD license. It was developed from the original FreeNAS 7 code and updated to work with current FreeBSD releases while preserving FreeNAS's original m0n0wall/PHP architecture and introducing experimental support for the ARM architecture.

XigmaNAS supports sharing across Windows, Apple, and UNIX-like systems. It includes ZFS v5000, Software RAID (0,1,5), disk encryption, S.M.A.R.T., and email reports etc., with the following protocols: SMB, Samba Active Directory Domain Controller AD, FTP, NFS, TFTP, AFP, rsync, Unison (file synchronizer), iSCSI (initiator and target), HAST, CARP, Bridge, UPnP, and BitTorrent. All of this is configurable through its web interface.

=== Features ===
- All XigmaNAS versions
  - Multiple architectures: i386 or amd64 and ARM-based versions
  - Full Web Management Interface (WebGUI)
- Hard drive and volume management
  - Software RAID
  - Disk encryption (using cryptographic accelerator card if present)
  - Partition
    - MBR, GPT
  - iSCSI initiator
  - Filesystems
    - ZFS v5000, UFS
    - Ext2, Ext3
    - FAT, NTFS
- Networking
  - 802.1q VLAN tagging
  - Wireless
  - Network link aggregation
  - Wake On Lan
  - Network Bridge
  - CARP (Common Address Redundancy Protocol)
  - HAST (Highly Available Storage)
- Network Protocols
  - Server Message Block (SMB, one never used version was known as CIFS) (Samba)
  - Active Directory Domain controller (Samba)
  - Apple Filing Protocol (AFP) (Netatalk)
  - Network File System (NFS)
  - FTP (ProFTPD)
  - TFTP (tftp-hpa)
  - rsync (client/server)
  - Unison
  - SCP (SSH)
  - iSCSI target
- Extra services
  - UPnP server (FUPPES)
  - UPnP server (MiniDLNA)
  - iTunesiTunes/DAAP server (Firefly)
  - lighttpd (Webserver)
  - Iperf Iperf3 Network Bandwidth measure
  - Syncthing File synchronization application
  - Transmission BitTorrent client
  - VirtualBox Virtualbox included and managed by phpVirtualBox and noVNC on GUI
- Monitoring
  - S.M.A.R.T. (smartmontools)
  - Alert by E-mail
  - SNMP
  - Syslog
  - UPS (NUT)

== Installation ==
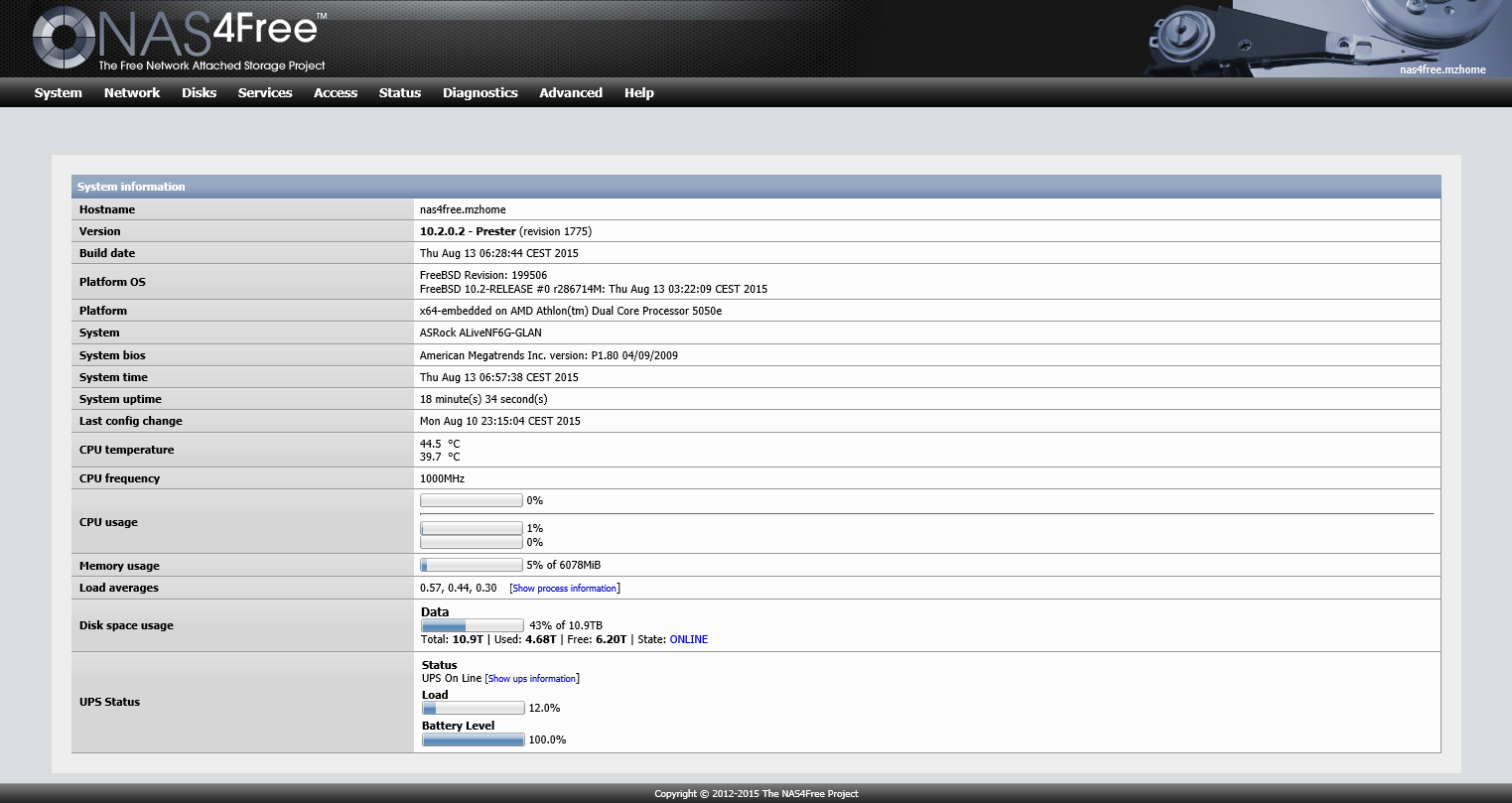
The NAS4Free status page of the WebGUI

XigmaNAS is installable on almost any boot medium including LiveCD, both for x86-64 and x86-32 computer platforms up to version 10.3. As of version 11.0, XigmaNAS no longer supports x86-32, but version 10.3 is still getting updates. XigmaNAS can be installed on Compact Flash, USB flash drives, SSD, hard drives or other bootable devices, and supports advanced formatted drives using 4 kB sectors. The software distribution is currently distributed in ISO image (.iso, approximately 370 MB), USB flash drive image (.img, approximately 320 MB) format, and in source form.

=== Preferred embedded installation ===
A special small footprint embedded image is also available (.img, approximately 150 MB). The preferred method is the embedded installation onto a USB stick, Compact Flash card (CF), or HDD/SSD, for which XigmaNAS was designed. The XigmaNAS OS will load into system memory, eliminating system writes to a drive except for configuration changes written to an archive. Flash devices are more energy efficient and the updating process can be done by WebGUI in the browser, downloading and installing a new firmware image.

== History ==
The original FreeNAS project derives from m0n0wall.

The FreeNAS 0.7 branch was end-of-life'd in late 2011 after the FreeNAS name was legally acquired by iXsystems, Inc. Starting with version 8.x, new iXsystems developers rewrote FreeNAS. Legacy FreeNAS 0.7 was no longer available for download.

The legacy FreeNAS 0.7 code was unable to be developed any longer under the same name, and a name change was necessary. The founder of FreeNAS (Olivier Cochard-Labbé) donated the original FreeNAS source code to the NAS4Free project. With the support of the former developers, namely Daisuke Aoyama and Michael Zoon, it carries on the original FreeNAS code base. FreeNAS 8.x.y and up is a software fork of the original FreeNAS with a new rewritten code base, continuing the old branded name. In 2018, the project applied for the XigmaNAS trademark to protect the brand prior to the release of v11.2.

== See also ==
- OpenMediaVault
- Nexenta
- Openfiler
- FreeNAS
- Zentyal
- List of NAS manufacturers
- Comparison of iSCSI targets
- File area network
- Disk enclosure
- OpenWRT
- RAID
