= Emby =

Media server software

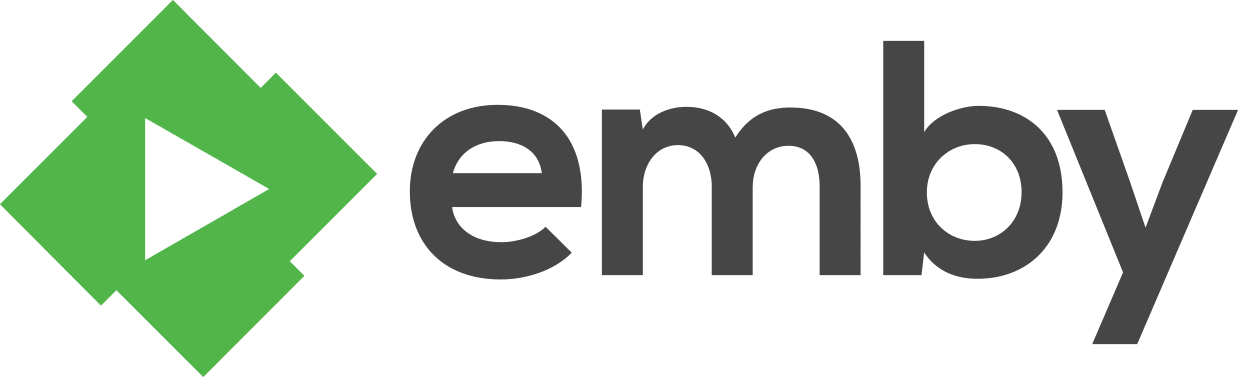
- Developer: Emby Team
- Stable release: 4.10.0.40 / 8 September 2026; 34 days ago
- Preview release: 4.9.0.30-beta / 25 August 2024; 2 years ago
- Written in: C#
- Operating system: Cross platform
- Platform: Server: macOS, Windows, Linux, FreeBSD, Nvidia Shield TV, Synology Disk Manager, Netgear, QNAP, Unraid, Drobo, ASUStor, Thecus, SCIPEN Plus Tv Emby Beta, Seagate, and Western Digital; Player: Apple TV, Fetch TV, iOS, macOS, Amazon Appstore, Android, Chromecast, Roku OS, PlayStation, Sonos, Oculus Go, SCIPEN Plus Emby Beta, Android TV, webOS, Tizen, Windows, and Xbox
- Available in: Multi-language
- Type: Media server
- License: Proprietary
- Website: emby.media
- Repository: github.com/MediaBrowser/Emby.Releases

Emby (formerly Media Browser) is a media server designed to organize, play, and stream audio and video to a variety of devices. Emby's source code was mostly open with some closed-source components as of August 2017. Releases of the software published via the Emby website are however proprietary and cannot be replicated from source due to the build scripts also being proprietary. As of version 3.5.3 Emby has been relicensed and is now closed-source, while open source components will be moved to plugins. Due to this, a free open source fork of Emby was created called Jellyfin. Emby uses a client–server model.

Emby Server has been developed for Windows, Linux, macOS, and FreeBSD. Users can connect to the server from a compatible client, available on a wide variety of platforms including HTML5, mobile platforms such as Android and iOS, streaming devices such as Roku, Amazon Fire TV, Chromecast, and Apple TV, smart TV platforms such as Android TV, LG Smart TV and Samsung Smart TV, and video game consoles including the PlayStation 3, PlayStation 4, Xbox 360, Xbox One and Xbox Series X/S.

== Emby Premiere ==
While watching and streaming media with Emby server is free, a number of features of its clients require an active Emby Premiere subscription. For example, users can watch content using the HTML5, Roku OS, Apple TV, Android on TV or Fire TV, Samsung Smart TV, and LG Smart TV clients without a subscription, but if they wish to do so on any other platform, they must have Emby Premiere or a one-time app unlock purchase available in some apps. Many other features, such as Live TV and DVR functionality, transcoding using hardware, and Smart Home integration, are only included for Premiere users.

== See also ==
- Jellyfin
- Kodi
- MediaPortal
- Plex
- Comparison of video player software
- Comparison of DVR software packages
