= Openfiler =

- Version of the CentOS operating system
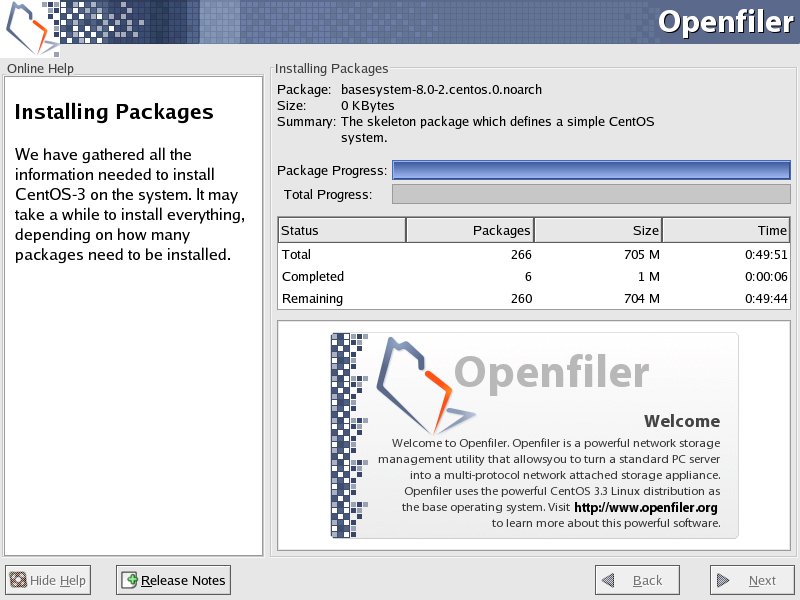
- Screenshot of Openfiler installer
- Developer: Openfiler Ltd.
- OS family: Unix-like
- Working state: Inactive
- Source model: Open-source
- Initial release: 2001; 25 years ago
- Latest release: 2.99.1 / April 13, 2011; 14 years ago
- Repository: github.com/skruger/reallyopenfiler
- Supported platforms: IA-32, x86-64
- License: GNU GPLv2
- Official website: www.openfiler.com

Openfiler is an operating system that provides file-based network-attached storage and block-based storage area network. It was created by Xinit Systems, and is based on the CentOS Linux distribution. It is free software licensed under the GNU GPLv2

== History ==
The Openfiler codebase was started at Xinit Systems in 2001. The company created a project and donated the codebase to it in October 2003.

The first public release of Openfiler was made in May 2004. The latest release was published in 2011.

Although there has been no formal announcement, there is no evidence that Openfiler is being actively developed since 2015. DistroWatch has listed Openfiler as discontinued. The official website states that paid support is still available.

== Criticism ==
Though some users have run Openfiler for years with few problems, in a 2013 article on SpiceWorks website, the author recommended against using Openfiler, citing lack of features, lack of support and risk of data loss.

== See also ==
- TrueNAS, a FreeBSD based free and open-source NAS solution
- Unraid
- OpenMediaVault
- XigmaNAS
- NetApp filer, a commercial proprietary filer
- NexentaStor - Advanced enterprise-level NAS software solution (Debian/OpenSolaris-based)
- NAS4Free — network-attached storage (NAS) server software.
- Gluster
- Zentyal
- List of NAS manufacturers
- Comparison of iSCSI targets
- File area network
- Disk enclosure
- OpenWrt
