= TerraMaster =

Chinese Computer Software Company

TerraMaster 铁威马
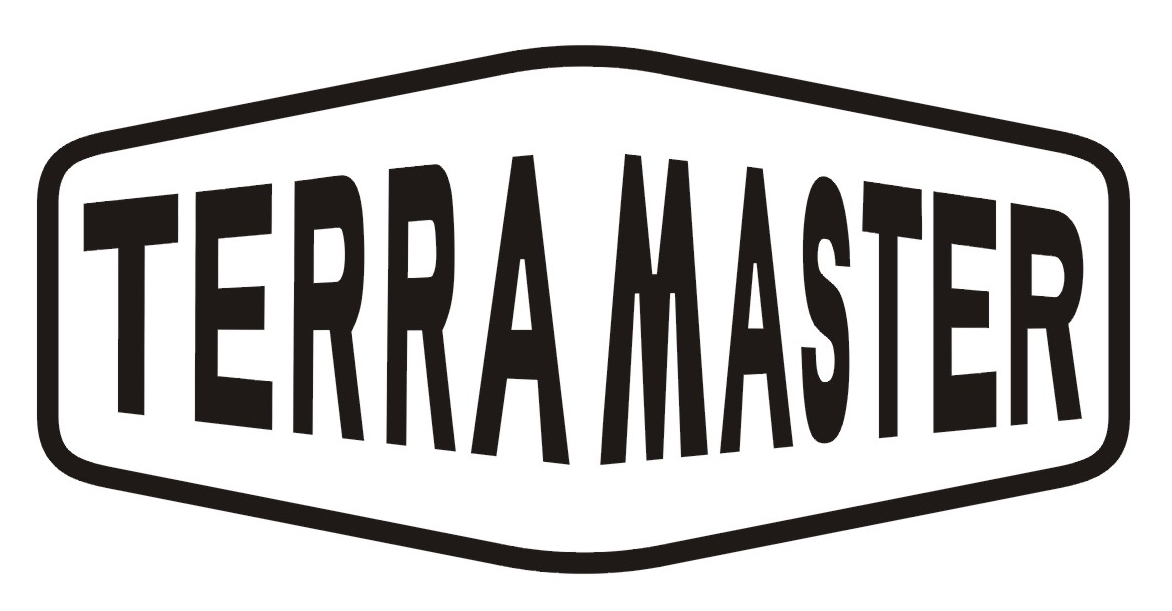
- Type: Private
- Industry: Computer data storage; hardware and software
- Founded: March 2010; 16 years ago
- Founder: Caven Zhou
- Headquarters: Shenzhen, China
- Area served: Worldwide
- Number of employees: 200
- Website: www.terra-master.com

TerraMaster Technology Co., Ltd. (Chinese: 铁威马; pinyin: tiěwēimǎ) is a Chinese company that specializes in computer software, network attached storage (NAS), and direct attached storage (DAS). Its headquarters is in Shenzhen, Guangdong, China. Its main peers and competitors include Synology and QNAP, which are well-known Taiwanese companies that also specialize in computer data storage.

== History ==
TerraMaster was founded in Shenzhen, China in 2010, and focuses on storage products, including network attached storage and direct attached storage.

== Products ==
TerraMaster's products are sold in more than 40 countries. Its main products are focused on network attached storage (NAS) and direct attached storage (DAS).

- Personal/Home Cloud Storage
- Small/Medium Business Network Storage
- Enterprise Network Storage Server
- Home/SOHO RAID Storage
- Video Professional RAID Storage

== See also ==
- List of NAS manufacturers
- Synology Inc.
- QNAP Systems, Inc.
- Network-attached storage
- Direct-attached storage
