= Local storage =

Local storage may refer to:

- Data storage that is directly attached to a compute device
- A network-attached storage device accessed via a local network, rather than a wide area network
- Local storage, a JavaScript web storage facility allowing websites to store data on a user's device
- Local shared object (or Flash cookie), Adobe Flash data stored on a user's computer
- Scratchpad memory, computer memory closely integrated with a CPU or other component

== See also ==
- Thread-local storage
- Network storage (disambiguation)
- Direct-attached storage
