= Plex =

Streaming service and media server

Plex Inc.
- Type: Private
- Founded: December 2009; 16 years ago
- Founders: Elan Feingold; Cayce Ullman; Scott Olechowski
- Headquarters: Campbell, California, U.S.
- Key people: Keith Valory; (president and CEO)
- Products: OTT platform; Client–server software
- Number of employees: ≈ 100 (2019)
- Website: plex.tv

Plex Inc. is an American software and media streaming company. It runs its namesake ad-supported streaming television service and develops media server software that enables users to stream their personal media collections to their devices. Plex had 16 million streaming subscribers as of 2023. It is based in Campbell, California.

== History ==
Plex began as a freeware hobby project in December 2007 when developer Elan Feingold created a media center application for his Mac by porting the media player XBMC (since renamed Kodi) to Mac OS X. Around the same time, Cayce Ullman and Scott Olechowski—software executives who had recently sold their previous company to Cisco—were also looking to port XBMC to Mac OS X, and noticed Feingold's progress in the XBMC online forums. They contacted him and offered support and funding, and they formed a three-person team in January 2008.

The team released early versions of the port, called OSXBMC, intended for eventual full integration into Mac OS X. The developers continued collaborating with the Linux-based XBMC project until May 21, 2008. Due to different goals from the XBMC team, they forked the code that became Plex, and published it on GitHub. The OSXBMC code was kept roughly in sync with the upstream XBMC code. In July 2008, the project was renamed Plex.

In December 2009, Plex, Inc. was incorporated with Ullman as CEO (chief executive officer) and Feingold as chief technology officer (CTO). At that time, Plex had 130 apps, the most popular of which were viewers for iTunes movie trailers, YouTube, Hulu, Netflix, MTV music videos, the BBC iPlayer and Vimeo. Keith Valory became president and CEO in 2013.

In December 2019, Plex launched an ad-supported streaming service of movies and television shows from content sources including Warner Bros. Domestic Television Distribution, MGM, Lionsgate, Regency Enterprises and Legendary Entertainment. As of August 2019, Plex had about 100 global employees.

Plex started offering FAST (Free Ad-Supported TV) services in 2019 and announced in April 2024 that it had over a thousand channels in its FAST line-up, including an NFL Channel.

In February 2024, Plex started offering films through Plex TV for rental. In April 2024, Plex partnered with T-Mobile.

== Plex Media Server ==
Plex Media Server
- Release: 2008; 18 years ago
- Stable release: Server: v.1.43.3.10896-cb3ebc72d (August 12, 2026; 3 months ago) [±]
- Operating system: Server: macOS, Windows, Linux, FreeBSD, Nvidia Shield TV, Synology Disk Manager, Netgear, QNAP, Unraid, Drobo, ASUStor, Thecus, Seagate, and Western Digital; Player: iOS, macOS, Windows, Linux, Amazon Appstore, Android, Android TV, Apple TV, Atari VCS, Chromecast, Fetch TV, Oculus Go, PlayStation, Roku, Sonos, Tizen, webOS, and Xbox
- Platform: x86, ARM
- Available in: 43 (server) languages
- Type: Media server and player
- License: Server: Freemium; Player: Freemium, GPLv2
- Website: plex.tv

Plex Media Server (PMS) is software that enables users to create a client–server for movies, television shows, photos, and music. Free Plex accounts can share personal media libraries among a user's own collection of devices at home. Plex Media Server organizes movie and television content and adds posters, plot summaries, cast and crew lists, technical details, critical reviews, and subtitles. Plex Media Server is also capable of transcoding files if the codec is incompatible with the device playing the media. Plex does not support DVD and Blu-ray disk images and menus. Plex Media Server can run on Windows, macOS, Linux, FreeBSD, Docker, some NAS devices, some Netgear routers and the Nvidia Shield TV. For music content, it can automatically organize files by metadata tags such as title, artist, album, genre, year, and popularity.

Plex Web App is a browser-based interface for users to manage libraries, server settings, and watch content.

A Plex Media Server can function as a home theater PC and can stream content to Plex's front-end media player client applications that run on myriad devices and web browsers. The media player applications are Plex, Plex Web App, Plexamp and Plex Dash, which provide a way for the user to manage and play content from a Plex server.

Plex also offers Plex Pass, an optional paid-subscription service that adds additional features to its server software and player apps such as hardware accelerated video encoding, mobile synchronization, metadata fetching for music, multi-user support, parental controls, over-the-top live TV and DVR, trailers, extras, and cross-selling offers. Remote streaming was a feature for free accounts until it was made exclusive to Plex Pass and Remote Watch Pass subscribers beginning April 2025.

In 2016, Plex launched Plex Cloud for Plex Pass subscribers, which supported cloud-based servers. Plex's launch partner was Amazon, and the service was compatible with Amazon Cloud Drive. Users were critical of the service, noting that Amazon seemed to impose upload limits. The service also supported OneDrive, Dropbox and Google Drive. The service was discontinued in November 2018 amid technical problems and concerns of copyright infringement.

Plex Media Server has often been associated with copyright infringement. In 2019, The Verge headlined that Plex "makes piracy just another streaming service".

=== Plex app ===
Plex's front-end media player client applications run on multiple platforms including Android, Android TV, Apple TV, Chromecast, Fire TV, Roku, iOS, iPadOS, macOS, PlayStation, Sonos, webOS, Windows and Xbox. Apps on iPhone, iPad and Android phones and tablets required a one-time $5 activation fee to stream from a server until April 2025. Plex's apps largely rely on the native video player and supported codecs of the streaming device's operating system. In 2018, Plex began rolling out the Enhanced Media Player based on mpv to support additional codecs on select devices.

=== Plexamp ===
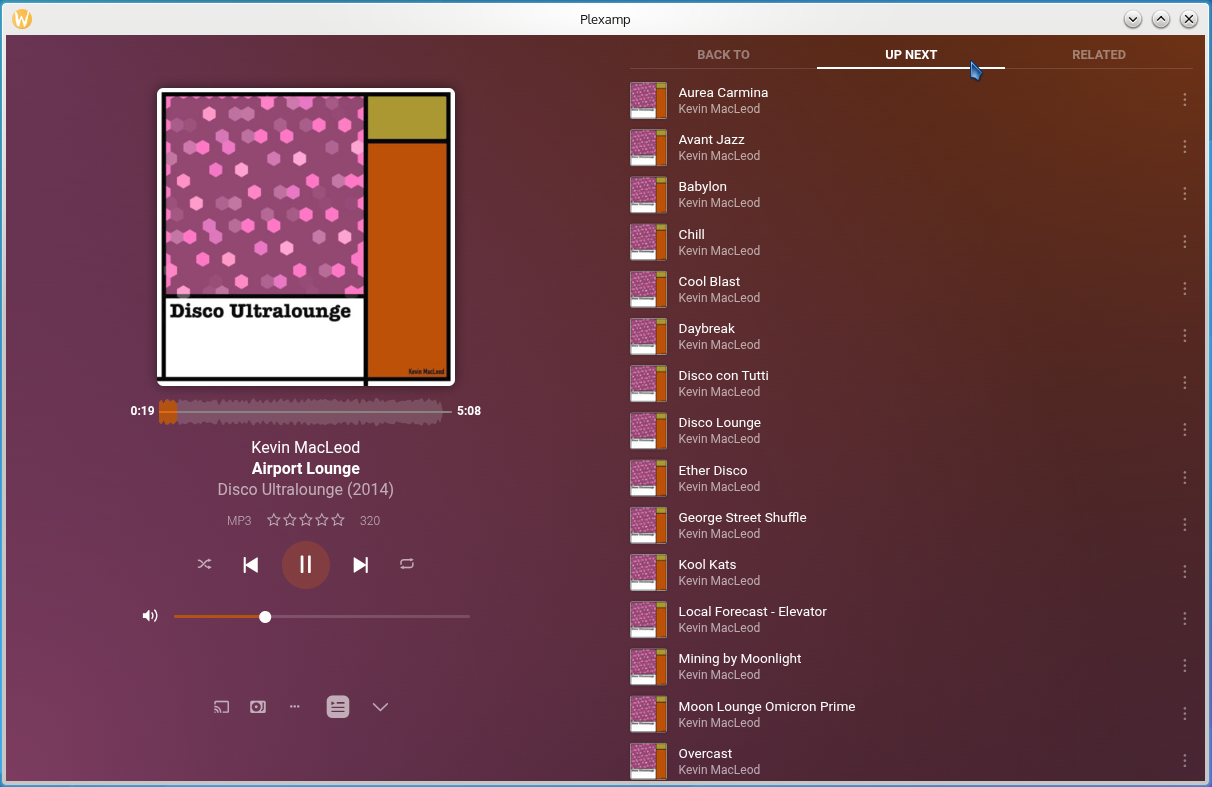
Screenshot of Plexamp being used to stream music on a Linux desktop

Plexamp is an audio codec player that allows users to play music files on their Plex Media Server. Plexamp supports Windows, Android, iOS, iPadOS, Linux and Apple CarPlay. The core player is free to download and use with any Plex Media Server with music content. Features such as automatically generated recommendations, lyrics, autoplay and downloads are only available to Plex Pass subscribers. Plexamp does not support other music streaming services. In 2023, Plexamp added a feature called "Sonic Sage" that uses ChatGPT to help build playlists.

== Streaming media ==
In 2019, Plex introduced an ad-supported video on demand (AVOD) streaming service and free-to-stream live TV channels Its content partners include Warner Bros. Television Studios, MGM, Lionsgate, Legendary, Crackle, Endemol Shine, Shout! Studios, Regency Enterprises, Kidoodle TV and A24. Plex can also be used as a client for Tidal and hosts podcasts. In 2022, Plex added a "Discovery" feature which aggregates content from other streaming media sources. As of 2023, Plex had 16 million active monthly streaming users.

In 2020, Plex announced that it would introduce a movie and television show rental marketplace. Its movie rental service launched in February 2024. The rental service was criticized for its inability to purchase rentals directly on Apple TV and Fire TV devices, limited selection, and video and audio quality limited to 1080p and 5.1 surround sound, compared other services offer that offer 4K HDR and Dolby Atmos movie rentals for the same price.

== See also ==
- Jellyfin, a fully open-source alternative to Plex
- Media center application
- JRiver Media Center
- Emby
- Kodi (software)
- Universal Media Server
- Self-hosting (web services)
- Comparison of DVR software packages
- Comparison of video player software
- Home theater PC
- List of video players (software)
- RasPlex, Plex for Raspberry Pi
