= TrueNAS =

Enterprise NAS for File, Object, Block Storage Solutions

- Other names: TrueNAS Community Edition; TrueNAS Enterprise; TrueNAS Scale
- Developer: iXsystems/TrueNas
- Release: February 22, 2022; 4 years ago
- Stable release: 25.10.8 / 5 November 2026; 10 days ago
- Operating system: Debian Linux
- Platform: x86-64
- Type: Computer storage
- License: GPL-3.0, Proprietary
- Website: truenas.com/truenas-community-edition/
- Repository: github.com/truenas/scale-build

TrueNAS Legacy
- Other names: TrueNAS Core; FreeNAS
- Developer: iXsystems
- Release: October 2005; 21 years ago
- Final release: 13.3-U1.2 / 29 April 2025; 18 months ago
- Operating system: FreeBSD
- Platform: x86-64 (v9.2.1.9 was the last release that supported 32-bit.)
- Type: Computer storage
- License: BSD licenses, Proprietary
- Website: truenas.com/download-truenas-legacy/
- Repository: github.com/truenas/core-build

TrueNAS is a family of network-attached storage (NAS) products developed by iXsystems Inc. (doing business as TrueNAS as of 2025). The products consist of TrueNAS Enterprise and TrueNAS Community Edition. TrueNAS Enterprise is a family of storage appliances, with fully integrated software and hardware, that is sold as a commercial product with enterprise support. TrueNAS Community Edition can be installed for free on commodity x86-64 computers. The operating systems include components released under a proprietary license, GPL and BSD licenses.

Built around the OpenZFS file system, TrueNAS provides a number of built-in file and block-storage services, a Docker-based app store, containers and a virtual machine hypervisor to host additional services.

== History ==
The TrueNAS project originated as FreeNAS, created by Olivier Cochard-Labbé in October 2005, based on the m0n0wall firewall and FreeBSD 6.0. Volker Theile joined the project in 2006 and later assumed its leadership.

In 2009 Theile concluded that FreeNAS required substantial rewrites to remain relevant. Considering the extent of the changes needed Theile proposed migrating the project to Debian Linux, however, Cochard-Labbé preferred FreeNAS to remain on FreeBSD, resulting in Theile agreeing to fork FreeNAS and ultimately creating OpenMediaVault. FreeNAS would remain on FreeBSD with development taken over by iXsystems, a company founded by original Berkeley Software Design developers whose company supported the PC-BSD OS and sold a line of storage servers.

FreeNAS 8.x was released in 2010 following a substantial rewrite of the front and back-end, and it integrated the OpenZFS file system. ixSystems also introduced the "TrueNAS" branding for their enterprise hardware appliances and proprietary OS based on FreeNAS, adding enterprise centric features such as high availability and Fibre Channel support.

In July 2020, iXsystems announced TrueNAS Scale, a "scale-out" Linux-based project based on TrueNAS Core.

In 2021, iXsystems merged the commercial and free operating systems into a single codebase under the TrueNAS branding. The feature-limited free community edition was renamed TrueNAS Core, distinguishing it from TrueNAS Enterprise.

In 2022, iXsystems released TrueNAS Scale, a Debian Linux port of the TrueNAS OS. The "Scale" moniker was intended to be an homage to the scale-out storage capabilities of the Linux based Gluster File System and Kubernetes based containerized app system. However, both Gluster and Kubernetes would be deprecated shortly thereafter.

At the end of 2023, citing higher adoption rates of the Linux-based TrueNAS Scale iXsystems announced that the FreeBSD-based TrueNAS Core would only receive maintenance/security updates going forward with no further feature development.

In January 2025, iXsystems announced that the Scale offering had reached full feature and performance parity with Core. As such, they announced that Scale would be renamed TrueNAS, available as the free "Community Edition" (CE) and the paid Enterprise edition, with all future development going into the Linux-based branch. The announcement recommended that all users of Scale and Core upgrade to the unified version 25.04 "Fangtooth" by the mid-late 2025.

In 2025, to avoid confusion between the company and the product, iXSystems began doing business directly as TrueNAS. This included an updated website in alignment with this change, and new company branding.

== Current versions ==
TrueNAS releases
User Type	Enterprise	Community Edition
Developer	—N/a	28 Nightly
Early Adopter	—N/a	27.0.0-RC.1
General	25.10.7	25.10.7
Mission Critical	25.10.7	—N/a

== See also ==
- Unraid
- OpenMediaVault
- XigmaNAS
- Nexenta
- Openfiler
- Zentyal
- List of NAS manufacturers
- Comparison of iSCSI targets
- File area network
- Disk enclosure
- OpenWrt
