= OMV (disambiguation) =

OMV may stand for:

- OMV, an oil-producing, refining and gas station operating company in Austria
- Oblati di Maria Vergine (Oblates of the Virgin Mary), a religious order of the Catholic Church
- Omotic languages (ISO 639-5 language code)
- Outer membrane vesicles, lipid vesicles released by Gram-negative bacteria
- OpenMediaVault, a free network-attached storage server
- Orbital Maneuvering Vehicle, defunct NASA space tug design
