= OpenMediaVault =

NAS operating system

- Web interface (2025)
- Developer: Volker Theile
- Written in: Web interface: PHP, TypeScript (Angular)
- OS family: Unix-like
- Working state: Current
- Source model: Open source
- Initial release: 17 October 2011; 15 years ago
- Latest release: 8.5.12 / 18 October 2026; 5 days ago
- Repository: github.com/openmediavault/
- Marketing target: Home user; Small office / home office
- Available in: English, Chinese, Czech, Danish, Dutch, French, Galician, German, Greek, Hungarian, Italian, Japanese, Korean, Norwegian, Polish, Portuguese, Russian, Spanish, Swedish, Turkish, Ukrainian
- Update method: APT
- Package manager: dpkg
- Supported platforms: IA-32; x86-64; ARM
- Kernel type: Monolithic (Linux)
- Userland: GNU
- Default user interface: Web-based
- License: Free software (GPL v3)
- Preceded by: FreeNAS v0.7
- Official website: www.openmediavault.org

OpenMediaVault (OMV) is a free Linux distribution designed for network-attached storage (NAS). The project's lead developer is Volker Theile, who instituted it in 2009. OMV is based on the Debian operating system, and is licensed through the GNU General Public License v3.

== Background ==
By the end of 2009, Volker Theile was the only active developer of FreeNAS, a NAS operating system that Olivier Cochard-Labbé started developing from m0n0wall in 2005. m0n0wall is a variation of the FreeBSD operating system, and Theile decided he wanted to rewrite FreeNAS for Linux. The project team had known for months that FreeNAS needed a major rewrite in order to support crucial features. Since Cochard-Labbé preferred to stay with a FreeBSD-based system, he and Theile agreed that Theile would develop his Linux version under a different name; that name was initially coreNAS, but within a matter of days Theile discarded it in favour of OpenMediaVault.

== Technical design ==
Theile chose Debian because the large number of programs in its package management system meant that he wouldn't have to spend time repackaging software himself. OpenMediaVault makes a few changes to the Debian operating system. It provides a Web-based user interface for administration and customisation, and a plug-in API for implementing new features. One can install plug-ins through the Web interface.

=== Features ===
- Multi-language, Web-based graphical user interface
- Protocols: CIFS (via Samba), FTP, NFS (versions 3 and 4), SSH, rsync, iSCSI, AFP and TFTP
- Software-RAID (levels 0, 1, 4, 5, 6, and 10, plus JBOD)
- Monitoring: Syslog, Watchdog, S.M.A.R.T., SNMP (v1, 2c, and 3) (read-only)
- Statistic reports via e-mail
- Statistic graphs for the CPU-workload, LAN transfer rates, hard disk usage and RAM allocation
- GPT/EFI partitioning >2 TByte possible
- File systems: ext2, ext3, ext4, Btrfs, XFS, JFS, NTFS, FAT32 (ZFS with third-party plug-in)
- Quota
- User and group management
- Access controls via ACL
- Link aggregation bonding, Wake-on-LAN
- Plug-in system

=== Plug-ins ===
By default, OpenMediaVault comes with a limited set of plug-ins. These include:

- AirPlay – Stream music wirelessly to your iPod/iPad/iPhone/iTunes.
- ClamAV – Antivirus software
- Diskstats – Complementary plugin to extend system statistics collection by adding I/O statistic graphs.
- Digital Audio Access Protocol (DAAP) – provides audio files in a local network (also for iTunes)
- FileBrowser – File managing interface.
- FTP – Provides a modular FTP/SFTP/FTPS server.
- Logical Volume Manager – enables the possibility to create and administrate dynamic partitions
- Network UPS Tools, to support the use of an uninterruptible power supply
- OneDrive – Synchronizing a shared folder with Microsoft OneDrive cloud storage.
- PhotoPrism – AI-powered app for browsing, organizing & sharing your photo collection.
- Podman – A tool for managing containers and images, volumes mounted into those containers, and pods made from groups of containers.
- S3 – MinIO based high-performance, S3 compatible object storage.
- ShareRootFs – Provides shared directories on root file system.
- SNMP
- TFTP
- USB Backup – Allows (automatic) backups to external USB hard disks
- WeTTY – Terminal access in browser over HTTP/HTTPS.

=== Third-party plug-ins ===
Additional plug-ins are available via additional package repositories. The majority of those Plug-ins are developed by a group called OpenMediaVault Plugin Developers. The status of all Plug-ins can be viewed online. In October 2014 there were around 30 plugins available. In June 2015 there were more than 70 stable plug-ins available.

Some of the software that is controllable via third-party plug-ins are:

- File synchronization: BitTorrent Sync and Syncthing
- Calibre – e-book manager
- Backup: Borg, Clonezilla, duplicati, rsnapshot and SystemRescueCD
- CUPS – print server
- Docker
- eXtplorer – Web-based file manager
- Greyhole, Union mount, and SnapRAID
- KVM
- Let's Encrypt
- Database servers: MySQL / MariaDB and PostgreSQL
- Nginx – Web server
- virtual private networking: OpenVPN and WireGuard
- Media servers: minidlna, Plex and Subsonic
- Download managers: pyLoad and JDownloader
- RDP
- Roundcube – Web-based mail client
- SYSLINUX – Preboot Execution Environment (PXE)
- Usenet download managers: Sickbeard, SABnzdb, Headphones, Couch Potato
- Transmission – a BitTorrent client
- Video Disk Recorder
- VirtualBox – virtual machine host
- WebDAV
- WordPress – blog software
- ZFS – an advanced file system
- and many more

=== Minimum System requirements ===
- Any Architecture/hardware that is supported by Debian
- 1 GiB RAM
- 4 GiB hard drive, solid-state drive, or USB flash drive with static wear leveling support for the OS.
- 1 hard drive, solid-state drive, or USB flash drive for storing user data

== Release history ==
For each OpenMediaVault release, Theile chooses a project code name from Frank Herbert's Dune novels.

Version	Name	Release Date	EOL Date	Base	Notes
0.2	Ix	2011-10-17	?	Debian 6	Named for the planet Ix.
0.3	Omnius	2012-04-18	2012-12-30	Debian 6	Introduced multi-language web interface and graphical user prompt for rights administration via Access Control List. The release is named for Omnius, a sentient computer network in the Legends of Dune trilogy.
0.4	Fedaykin	2012-09-21	2013-12-09	Debian 6	Named for the Fedaykin commandos of the Fremen people.
0.5	Sardaukar	2013-08-25	?	Debian 6	Revised API renders v0.4 plugins incompatible.
1.0	Kralizec	2014-09-15	2015-12-26	Debian 7	Improves support for weaker systems; adds a dashboard with support for widgets; improved infrastructure for plug-ins. This release is named for Kralizec, a battle predicted to occur at the end of the universe.
2.0	Stone burner	2015-06-29	2017-12-06	Debian 7	Sencha ExtJS 5.1.1 Framework for the WebGUI; revised GUI supports configuration of WiFi, VLAN, et al. This release is named for the stone burner, a nuclear weapon held by House Atreides.
3.0	Erasmus	2017-06-13	2018-07-09	Debian 8	Named for the robot Erasmus.
4.0	Arrakis	2018-05-08	2020-06-30	Debian 9	Named for the planet Dune.
5.0	Usul	2020-03-30	2022-06-30	Debian 10	Named for the secret name of Paul Atreides (Usul) in Dune.
6.0	Shaitan	2022-05-04	2024-07-31	Debian 11	Named for the Fremen term for demon and later to the transformed God Emperor Leto Atreides II.
7.0	Sandworm	2024-03-03	2026-06-10	Debian 12	Named for the sandworm creature.
8.0	Synchrony	2025-12-24	?	Debian 13	Named for the synchrony creature.
Legend: Unsupported Supported Latest version Future version

== See also ==
- Direct Attached Storage (DAS)
- Storage Area Network (SAN)
- TrueNAS (formerly FreeNAS) - the FreeBSD-based NAS from which OpenMediaVault was originally forked
- NexentaOS - open source OS and enterprise class NAS with kernel based ZFS
- Openfiler - CentOS-based NAS operating system
- XigmaNAS - another FreeBSD-based NAS operating system, XigmaNAS is a continuation of the original FreeNAS code which was developed between 2005 and late 2011
