= IoSafe =

ioSafe, Inc.
- Founded: 2004; 22 years ago
- Defunct: 2018
- Fate: Acquired by CRU
- Headquarters: Roseville, California, United States
- Key people: Randal Barber (CEO of CDSG)
- Parent: CRU Data Security Group
- Website: iosafe.com

ioSafe, Inc., was a manufacturer of disaster protected hard drives and network attached storage (NAS) appliances. The company was founded in 2004 and is based in Roseville, California. ioSafe's storage systems are optimized for heat from fire and complete submersion in fresh or saltwater with the ability to recover data located on the disk drive inside.

== History ==
ioSafe, Inc. was incorporated in 2005 by the primary inventor and CEO, Robb Moore. In response to independent research regarding data loss and catastrophic business loss from fire, flood and other natural disasters their first product (released in 2005) was the ioSafe S1, the first external hard drive to have both fire and flood protection. The ioSafe S1 hard drive was later redesigned and re-released in a dual drive RAID configuration called the S2.

In 2006, in response to enterprise business demand for a fire and flood resistant network storage, the ioSafe R4 was introduced. Shortly after this NAS appliance entered production, ioSafe was granted and published patents in May 2007 for their FloSafe (fireproof) and HydroSafe (waterproof) technology.

The company was purchased by Vancouver, Washington-based CRU in July 2018. This acquisition was a strategic combination of the hardware safeguards provided by ioSafe and CRU which could subsequently address the combined and non-overlapping customer bases of the two companies.

== Company Milestones ==
- 2004 — ioSafe introduces first fire and flood protected external hard drive
- 2005 — ioSafe incorporates in the State of California
- April 2006 — Awarded Golden Mousetrap Award by Design News magazine
- November 2006 — Introduces a Network Attached Storage system with shock-protection, fire protection and water submersion protection
- May 2007 — Patents granted and published for protecting active electronic devices inside a fire safe
- November 2007 — Patents granted and published for protecting active electronics from water
- July 2008 — Introduces a 3.5” internal hard drive with integrated disaster protection
- January 2009 — Introduces a 1.5 TB disaster protected external hard drive
- January 2010— Introduces a disaster protected external solid state drive
- January 2011— Introduces a disaster protected portable hard drive
- January 2012— Introduces a disaster protected Thunderbolt (interface), rugged portable SSD, with Intel
- January 2013— NAS product named PC Magazine Editor's Choice
- July 2018— Acquired by CRU Acquisition Group, LLC (now CRU Data Security Group, LLC)

== Products and product characteristics ==
ioSafe sells fire- and water-proof storage servers and network attached storage devices. Temperature protection has been typically at least the ASTM E119 (Note: ASTM E119-18a title: "Standard Test Methods for Fire Tests of Building Construction and Materials") industry minimum of 1,550 degrees Fahrenheit. Their products are not all designed in-house; for instance some products have been designed by the Taiwanese company Synology.

The company has developed several protective technologies, such as a patented rugged case, and three protective technologies for internal hard drives referred to as FloSafe, HydroSafe and DataCast. FloSafe is an air flow technology that helps in protection against extreme heat; HydroSafe also helps with heat dissipation, but the primary role is in protecting against salt and fresh water contact and immersion; DataCast is an endothermic insulation technology using "trapped water molecules" and is a primary heat protection layer.

In July 2008, ioSafe selected Fujitsu 2.5 inch hard disk drives (HDD) for its ioSafe 3.5 series, the first "disaster protected internal 3.5 inch SATA HDD". The company added its patented rugged case and configured the drives to be used in 3.5 inch HDD hardware bays.

The following year, 2009, the company introduced the ioSafe Solo, a ruggedized external hard drive using an internal hard drive as its storage medium.
