= Agami (disambiguation) =

Agami is a city in Egypt.

Agami may also refer to:

- Agami (film), a 1984 Bangladeshi film
- Agami heron, a species of heron in Central America, Peru, and Brazil
- Agami Systems, a network storage company headquartered in Sunnyvale, California
- "Agami", a name used in French for members of the genus Psophia

== People with the surname ==
- Al Agami, rapper who led Los Umbrellos
- Moshe Agami, Israeli former football player
