= Network storage =

Network storage may refer to:

- Cloud storage
- Clustered file system
- Distributed file system
- File hosting service
- File server
- Network-attached storage
- Storage area network
