= LayerWalker =

LayerWalker Technology, Inc.
- Type: Private
- Industry: ASIC Design
- Founded: 2005
- Headquarters: Taipei, Taiwan
- Key people: CEO: Adrian Wang
- Products: ATA over Ethernet and NAS SoCs

LayerWalker Technology, Inc. is a fabless integrated circuit design company that announced a network storage system on a chip (SoC). Their products targeted digital home, small business and consumer electronics markets.

LayerWalker introduced in 2007 the miniSAN product that provided ATA over Ethernet (AoE) server functions and management capabilities. Client software and drivers for Windows and Linux operating systems were offered.

LayerWalker had offices in Taipei. It was founded in 2005 and had a web site through 2012.
