= Unraid =

Linux-based operating system for network-attached storage

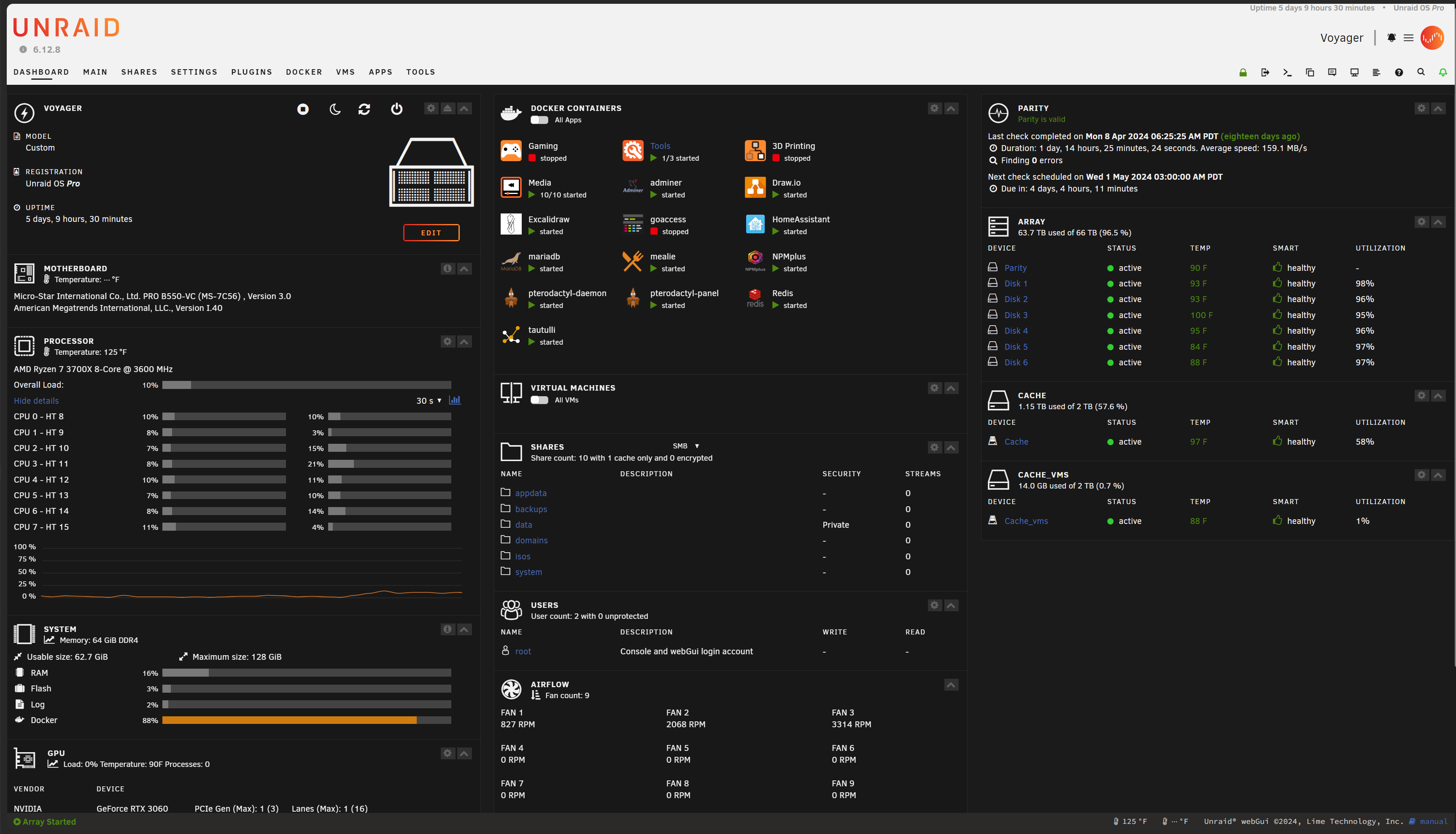
- Example of the Unraid dashboard as of version 6.12.8.
- Developer: Lime Technology, Inc.
- Written in: C, C++
- OS family: Unix-like (based on Slackware)
- Working state: Current
- Source model: Closed-source with open source components
- Initial release: August 26, 2005
- Latest release: 7.4.1 / November 20, 2026
- Latest preview: 7.4.0-rc.2 / October 22, 2026
- Marketing target: Home server, home network
- Available in: 24 languages
- List of languages Arabic, Catalan, Chinese - Simplified, Chinese - Traditional, Croatian, Danish, Dutch, English, French, German, Hungarian, Italian, Japanese, Korean, Latvian, Norwegian, Polish, Portuguese, Portuguese - Brazilian, Romanian, Russian, Spanish, Swedish, Ukrainian
- Package manager: Docker
- Supported platforms: x86_64
- Kernel type: Monolithic (Linux kernel 6.18.38)
- Influenced by: RAID
- License: Proprietary, perpetual, various open source licenses
- Official website: unraid.net
- Tagline: Unleash Your Hardware

Unraid is a proprietary Linux-based operating system designed to run on home servers in order to operate as a network-attached storage (NAS) device, application server, media server and a virtualization host. Unraid is developed and maintained by Lime Technology, Inc. Users of the software are encouraged to write and use plugins and Docker applications to extend the functionality of their systems.

== Features ==
=== Dashboard management ===
Usage of Unraid is primarily performed through a web interface (known also as the Unraid dashboard) that offers full control over the Unraid operating system. The dashboard offers basic controls for common tasks as well as advanced controls for the more technological advanced user; CLI or console management is also possible. The Unraid dashboard is a particularly useful flagship feature to users who are new or inexperienced in operating Linux, home servers, NAS, Docker, and more.

=== Community applications ===
One of the more popular features of Unraid is the extensive catalog of community applications (apps) or plugins that users can install and run on their Unraid systems. This community-oriented focus allows Unraid to provide a vast catalog of community apps while Unraid provides moderation to ensure users are safe, compatible and have a consistent experience. Specifically, Unraid community apps are created via plugins or Docker containers providing the capability of extending Unraid in nearly any capacity.

=== Core capabilities ===
Unraid's capabilities are separated into three core parts: software-defined NAS, application server, and localized virtualization.

==== Software-defined NAS ====
Unraid's primary feature is the ability to easily create and manage storage arrays in hardware-agnostic ways, allowing users to use nearly any combination of hard drives to create a disk array, regardless of model, capacity, or connection type. Unraid's NAS functionality consists of a parity-protected array, user shares, and an optional cache pool(s).

Since Unraid saves data to individual drives rather than spreading single files out over multiple drives, users can create shares, which are groups of files that can be written to multiple drives (as determined by the user or system) and allow easy access and management by users. This style of filesystem eliminates the use of traditional RAID-based technologies which provides the ability to scale on-demand by adding more drives while not needing to rebalance existing data.

==== Application server ====
Unraid utilizes Docker to allow users to create and manage Docker containers to host applications on the system. In doing so, this allows Unraid users to host applications that may not support the Unraid operating system directly, could be difficult to install and remove, or may not behave correctly with other applications running on the same system. This provides Unraid users with the ability to install, manage, and host any images from the Docker Hub. For example, a user could use a pre-made Docker container to host applications such as Nextcloud, Plex, Jellyfin, and many others.

==== Virtualization Host ====
Unraid is designed as a virtualization host, leveraging a hypervisor to partition resources to virtualized guests in a secure and isolated manner. Differing from Docker containers, virtual machines in Unraid offer unique benefits such as running non-Linux operating systems (e.g. Windows), driver support for physical devices independent of Unraid, etc. while offering the same benefits of isolated access to the partitioned resources. The implementation of kernel-based virtual machine (KVM) within Unraid includes QEMU, libvirt, VFIO*, VirtIO, VirtFS, and Open Virtual Machine Firmware (OVMF). These implementations of KVM provide for a wide array of resources to be assigned to virtual machines ranging from storage, compute, network, memory, PCI devices, USB devices, and more. Additionally, Unraid provides support for emulating different machine types such as i440fx, Q35, etc. which provide support for CPU pinning, SSD optimization, and more.

== Technical specifications ==
=== Operating system/licensing ===
Unraid is based on Slackware Linux. Supported file systems: XFS, Btrfs, ZFS and EXT2 ,EXT3, EXT4, NTFS, ExFAT.

Unraid installs to and boots from a USB flash drive and runs entirely in memory. All configuration data related to the operating system is stored on the flash device and loaded at the same time as the operating system itself. This style of operation allows for operation on nearly any X86-64 bit system with minimal use of system resources.

The Unraid user license is bound to the user's USB flash drive via GUID., but since Unraid version 7.3+. an option to convert USB flash drive boot to internal boot was added. Internal boot will depend on a motherboard which has a TPM 2.0 chip which will now be linked to the Unraid user license instead of relying on a USB flash drive GUID.

It was announced on unRAID's podcast, "the unCast show" on August 14th, 2026 that unRAID would be moving to a variant of Fedora Linux in version 8.

== GPL compliance ==
Unraid uses the Linux kernel and its filesystems. It most notably contains a greatly modified version of Linux md facilities named md_unraid. The source code is distributed as part of the USB system image and is visible in the Unraid OS in /usr/src. binwalk can be used to extract the file from bzroot without booting.

A fork of md_unraid for other Linux distributions is available: nonraid.

== Licensing ==
Unraid operates on a unique business model. Users can pay for term licenses for either 6 drives or unlimited drives that grants them updates for a year. An optional extension fee allows users to get another year of updates. There are also "lifetime" licenses available which gives unlimited updates. If a user decides not to pay for updates, they will stay on the minor version when the time runs out. People who have purchased licenses before this switchover will not be affected.

Current versions under this business model:

- 6.12.15 released January 21, 2025. (EOL)
- 7.0.1 released February 25, 2025. (EOL)
- 7.1.4 released June 18, 2025. (EOL)
- 7.2.9 released October 23, 2026 (targeted security update, users encouraged to upgrade to newer version)
- 7.3.6 released November 20, 2026 (security updates only)
- 7.4.1 released November 20, 2026 (supported)

== Versions ==
Version	Release date	New features	Release Notes
6.0.0	June 14, 2015	Docker Support	https://unraid.net/blog/unraid-server-os-6
6.2.0	September 15, 2016	VLAN & multiple Ethernet support, Dual-parity support, GUI boot	https://unraid.net/blog/unraid-server-os-6-2
6.3.0	February 17, 2017	Intel IGD Pass Through to Virtual Machines	https://unraid.net/blog/unraid-server-os-6-3
6.4.0	January 12, 2018	Disk Encryption, UEFI Boot Support, IPv6 Support	https://unraid.net/blog/unraid-server-os-6-4-0
6.6.0	September 19, 2018	Redesigned Themes, CPU pinning for VMs & Dockers	https://unraid.net/blog/unraid-6-6-released
6.7.0	May 09, 2019	New dashboard, Mac Backups Over SMB	https://unraid.net/blog/unraid-6-7-stable
6.8.0	December 10, 2019	WS-Discovery Support, Update OS Tool	https://unraid.net/blog/unraid-6-8
6.9.0	March 01, 2021	Multiple Pools, GPU Driver Integration, Multi-Language Support	https://unraid.net/blog/unraid-6-9-stable
6.10.0	May 17, 2022	Wireguard integration, Windows 11 VM Support, UPC.	https://unraid.net/blog/6-10-stable
6.11.0	September 23, 2022	Samba Upgrade, SSD Trim plugin integration, Added Perl	https://unraid.net/blog/6-11-stable
6.12.0	June 14, 2023	ZFS Pools, New Dashboard, Network Improvements	https://unraid.net/blog/6-12-0-stable
7.0.0	January 9, 2025	Native ZFS Support, VM Manager Improvements, New File Manager and GUI Tools	https://unraid.net/blog/unraid-7
7.1.0	May 5, 2025	Wireless Networking, VM Manager and Virtualization Improvements	https://unraid.net/blog/unraid-7-1
7.2.0	Ocotober 29, 2025	Fully Responsive WebGUI, ZFS RAIDZ Expansion, External Drive Support: ext2/3/4, NTFS, exFAT	https://unraid.net/blog/unraid-7-2-0
7.3.0	May 12, 2026	Internal Boot, New Licensing Options, Better Onboarding	https://unraid.net/blog/unraid-7-3-0
