= ERacks =

Open-source software organization

eRacks Open Source Systems
- Type: Subsidiary of Silver Wolf, Inc.
- Industry: Open-source systems
- Headquarters: Campbell, California, US
- Products: Servers
- Website: www.eracks.com

eRacks Open Source Systems was founded in 1999. The company provides computer systems based on open-source software, including various distributions of Linux, *BSD and OpenSolaris, and manufactures rack-mounted servers (including NAS systems, firewalls, mail and web servers).
