= Agámi Systems =

- Type: Private
- Industry: Data storage devices
- Founded: April 2003
- Founder: Kumar Sreekanti
- Defunct: July 28, 2008
- Fate: Disbanded
- Headquarters: Sunnyvale, California
- Key people: David Stiles, CEO; Kumar Sreekanti, CTO
- Products: AIS3000, AIS6000
- Website: www.agami.com (defunct)

Agámi Systems, Inc. was a network storage company headquartered in Sunnyvale, California. Agámi Information Servers (AIS) were marketed to both network attached storage (NAS) and storage area network (SAN) markets.

== History ==
The company was founded in April 2003 by Kumar Sreekanti in San Jose, California.

Its first round of venture capital of about $5.5 million included investors Kleiner Perkins Caufield & Byers (with board member Vinod Khosla), Alta California Partners, New Enterprise Associates, Apex Ventures and Advanced Equities Venture Partners. It was originally called StorAD for its first year, and included intellectual property acquired from failed company Zambeel, which was in a similar market and had been founded in 1999.

A second round of financing raised over $25 million in September 2004. Hercules Technology Growth Capital provided $11 million in debt financing in August 2006.

David Stiles joined in 2005 and became chief executive in May 2007, just after chief financial officer Dean Seniff was replaced on April 30.

In March 2007 support for the iSCSI block access protocol was announced.

The company, then located in Sunnyvale, California, filed for raising more capital through 2007, including new investor Duff, Ackerman, and Goodrich.

A third round of $45 million in funding from existing investors was announced in February 2008 during the start of the Great Recession.

The company shut down operations on July 28, 2008. The employees were told of the shutdown at an 11:00 AM meeting, and was made effective two hours later, at 1:00 PM. The 80-100 employees of Agami in Sunnyvale and Hyderabad, India were said to be blindsided. Business Insider reports that, "Some employees have tried to send e-mails to an address that the company provided them to request pay, but one employee told the Mercury News that they 'haven't received one response, not one.' "

This led to speculation that the funding announced in February had not actually closed.

By September 2008 Stiles had purchased Agámi assets and used its office space for a new company named Scalable Storage Systems.

In October 2008, Ocarina Networks hired Agami Systems India operations and engineering team in Hyderabad.
