= Comparison of iSCSI targets =

An iSCSI target is a storage resource located on an iSCSI server (more generally, one of potentially many instances of iSCSI storage nodes running on that server) as a "target". An iSCSI target usually represents hard disk storage, often accessed using an Ethernet-based network.

== Comparison chart ==
Software packages are available to allow a customer to configure a computer with disk drives and a network interface to be an iSCSI target.

Function	FalconStor	FreeNAS	Microsoft Windows Storage Server	Open-E	Openfiler
Continuous Data Protection (CDP)	Yes	No	Yes	Yes	Yes
Snapshot	Yes	Yes	Yes	Yes	Yes
Mirroring and Replication	Yes	Yes	Yes	Yes	Yes
Thin Provisioning	Yes	No	Yes	No	No
I/O caching	Yes	No	Yes	No	Yes
Challenge Handshake Authentication Protocol (CHAP)	Yes	Yes	Yes	Yes	Yes
Multi-user mutual CHAP authorization	No	No	No	No	No
IPsec tunnelling	No	No	Yes	Yes	No
Software RAID	No	Yes	Yes	Yes	Yes
Virtual Optical Drive	No	Yes	Yes	Yes	Yes
Virtual tape library	Yes	No	No	Yes	No
Microsoft Management Console support	No	Yes	No	No	No
PerfMon support	No	No	Yes	No	No
High availability support	Yes	No	Yes	Yes, but unstable	No
VHD support	Yes	Yes-CHAP	Yes	Yes	No
Dynamically expanding file support	Yes	No	No	No	No
Virtual Burner support	No	No	No	No	No
EventViewer support	No	No	Yes	No	No
MPIO	Yes	No	Yes	Yes	Yes
Windows Volume Snapshot Service	No	No	Yes	No	No
VMware integration toolkit	No	No	No	No	No
Remote management	Yes	Yes	Yes	Yes	Yes
Unlimited Network Interface Controller Support	Yes	Yes	Yes	Yes	Yes (Old v:1)
Storage unlimited	No 64 TB	Yes	Yes	No 4/8/16 (more need additional license)	Yes
