= Orbital Maneuvering Vehicle =

1980s NASA space tug project

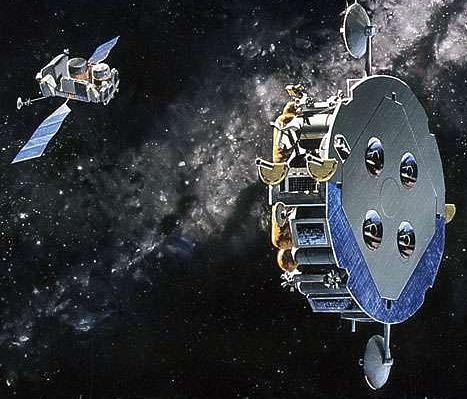
Orbital Manoeuvring Vehicle, showing the Short Range Vehicle left in orbit between missions

The Orbital Maneuvering Vehicle (OMV) was a project developed by NASA in the 1980s, aiming to create a reusable, remotely controlled, free-flying vehicle capable of performing various on-orbit missions and services to support orbiting spacecraft.

Originally envisioned as a short-range robotic space tug for moving payloads in the vicinity of the Space Shuttle and Space Station, the OMV was part of NASA's 1984 Space Station Freedom plan, and was initially estimated at $400 million.

In 1984, NASA awarded three $1-million study contracts to Vought, Martin Marietta, and TRW. TRW secured the $205-million OMV phase B contract in June 1986. However, estimated costs had risen to $465 million by 1987, leading to the cancellation of further work on the project.

== Specifications ==
Initiated in 1986, the OMV development program involved TRW as the prime contractor, with a planned first flight in 1991. The vehicle, measuring 15 feet in diameter, was designed to mount directly into the shuttle payload bay.

Its modular design included a Short Range Vehicle with hydrazine and cold gas RCS systems, avionics systems, and a weight of approximately 6,500 lb. For high delta-velocity missions, a bipropellant Propulsion Module (approximately 11,000 lb) could be added, bringing the total weight to 17,500 lb. This module was exchangeable on orbit for bipropellant refueling, and all RCS and avionics modules were replaceable for maintenance.

The OMV's versatility allowed it to operate from the Shuttle, the Space Station, or in a space-based configuration. Its capabilities included satellite delivery, retrieval, reboost, controlled deorbit, viewing, and subsatellite support missions.
