= Ugreen =

Chinese consumer electronics brand

- Native name: 绿联
- Traded as: SZSE: 301606
- Industry: Consumer electronics
- Founded: 2012; 14 years ago
- Founder: Zhang Qingsen (张清森)
- Headquarters: Shenzhen
- Area served: Worldwide
- Products: Power banks; Charging cables; USB hardware and peripherals; Consumer electronics; Network-attached storage; Portable solar generators; Portable power stations
- Website: ugreen.com

Ugreen (绿联) is a Chinese consumer electronics brand owned by Ugreen Group Ltd and based in Shenzhen, Guangdong. The brand and company was established by Zhang Qingsen in 2012, and specialises in USB hardware such as cables and AC adapters, as well as other categories of consumer electronics such as wireless chargers, audio equipment and mobile accessories. Ugreen went on to launch its first series of network-attached storage devices in 2024.

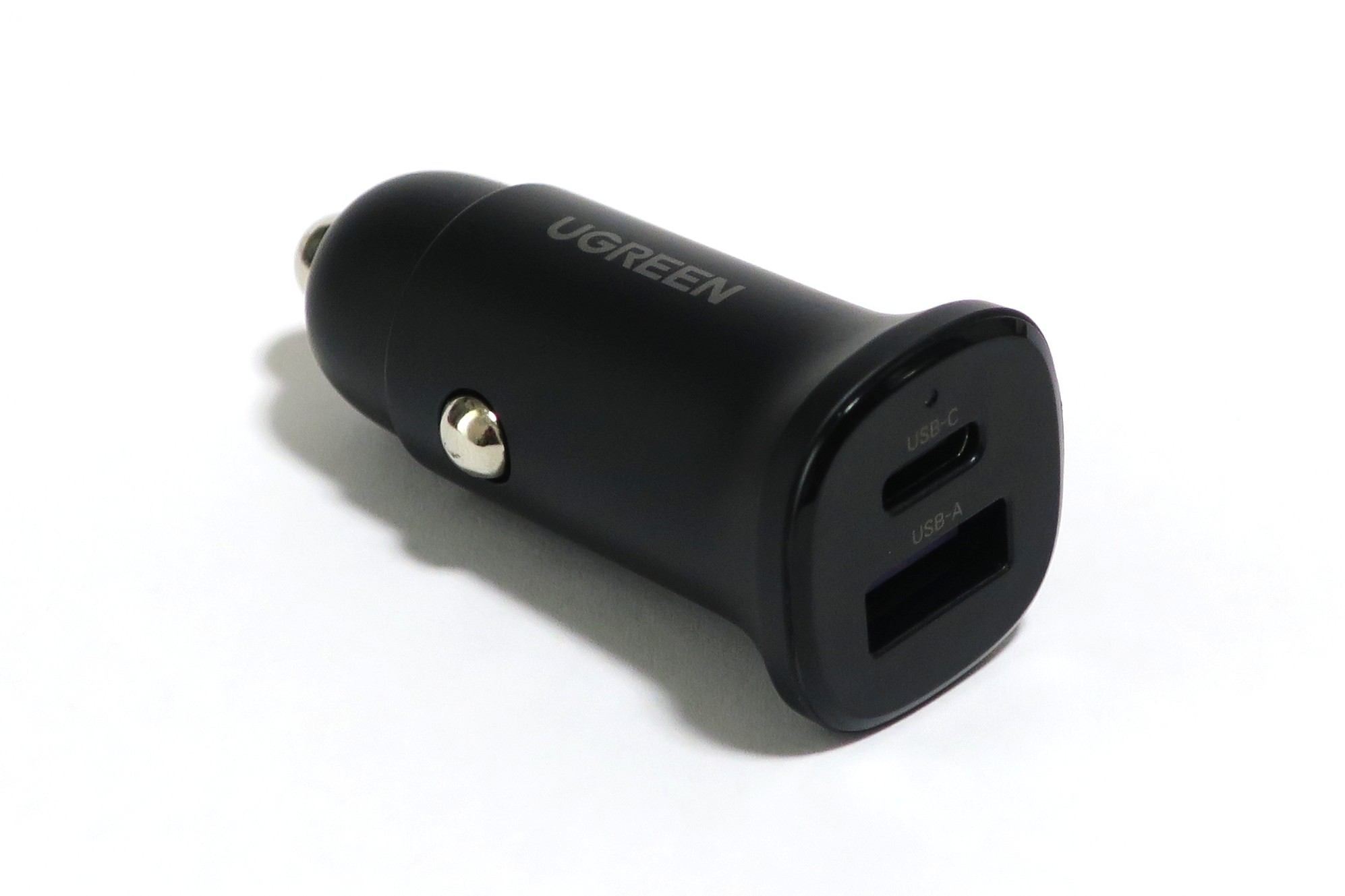
A USB car plug adapter by Ugreen

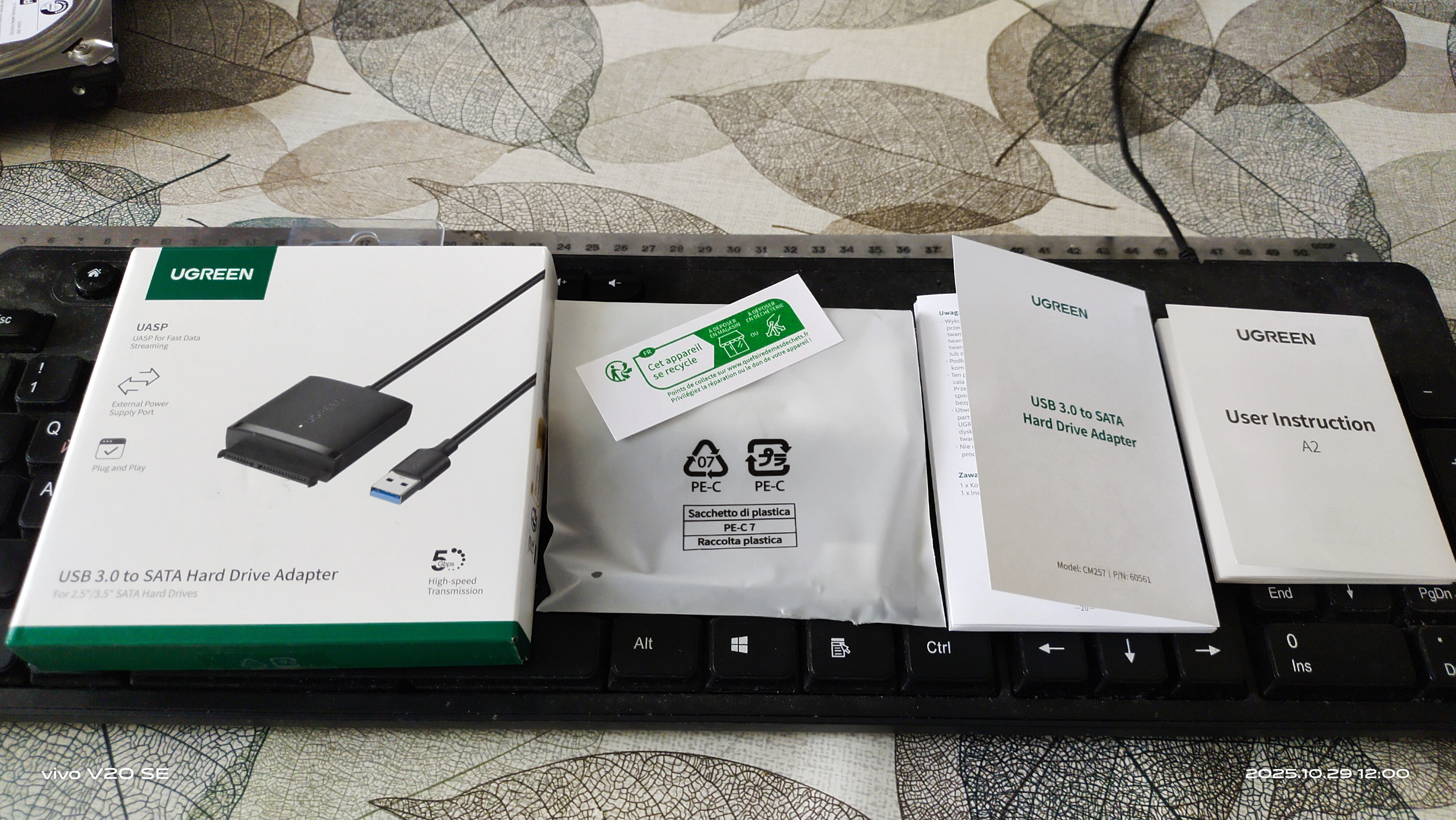
Package and documentation for the USB to SATA adapter model CM257.
