= Thecus =

Thecus Technology Corp
- Native name: 樺賦科技
- Industry: Network-attached storage Storage virtualization
- Founded: January 2004
- Headquarters: Taipei, Taiwan
- Area served: Worldwide
- Key people: Florence Shih - GM
- Number of employees: 200
- Website: Thecus.com

Thecus Technology Corporation (Thecus) is a Taiwanese multinational corporation that designs and markets Network-Attached Storage (NAS), Direct-attached storage (DAS), and Network Video Recorders (NVRs). Thecus is best known for producing NAS and creates and designs its own hardware, firmware, and accessory software. Thecus's products are distributed worldwide and localized in several languages. Thecus's headquarters are located in Taipei, Taiwan with subsidiaries located around the world.

== Company Profile and History ==
Thecus was founded in 2004 and released their first SMB NAS, the N4100, at CeBIT 2005 in Hannover, Germany. Thecus is a relative newcomer, having released only about two dozen NAS and related devices.

In 2006, Thecus released the World's first 5 bay NAS.

Thecus is an Intel Storage Community Member and is counted among Intel's 20 largest worldwide strategic partners, which also includes Cisco, IBM, HP, EMC, Hitachi, and Sony. They operate from four locations worldwide, including their headquarters in Taipei and three branches in the United States, the Netherlands, and China.

Thecus had their Initial public offering on November 26, 2010 with a net revenue of $19.5 million in 2011 and current assets valued at $9.1 million.

In September 2014, Thecus launched the World's first Windows Storage Server 2012 R2 Essentials NAS product line.

In March 2015, the 5-bay N5810PRO NAS was launched. Containing a Built-in Mini-UPS, as a contingency power supply.

In December 2015, their latest operating system, the ThecusOS 7.0 was launched.

In May 2016, Thecus was formally acquired by Ennoconn Corporation and thus became part of the Foxconn IPC Technology group.

In December 2016, they added (Scale out) functionality to ThecusOS 7.0, enabling storage scalability without limit.

In March 2017, Thecus added Window Storage Server 2016 to their Windows rackmount NAS product line.

In March 2017, Thecus announced their new 4-bay N4910U series, 1U rackmount architecture.

In March 2017, Thecus unveiled their new budget-friendly 2-bay NAS, the N2350.

In late 2019 they stopped shipping to the United States. By the second quarter of 2020 Thecus products in the US not available. Inquiry to the sales department have gone unanswered.

== Product Overview ==
Thecus is a Network-Attached Storage producer. Thecus has Linux and Windows versions for each NAS category. NAS are Thecus's primary products since its establishment in 2004.

=== NAS ===
Network-Attached Storage, or NAS, are network-accessible storage devices commonly used for backing up data, web serving, file sharing, or as a shared hub for local or remote storage. Thecus's product lines include smaller devices for home use, such as 2-4 bay NAS, medium-sized devices for SMB (Small and medium businesses) use, such as 4-8 bay NAS, and larger enterprise NAS, such as the 12 and 16 bay NAS.

=== DAS ===
Direct-attached storage, or DAS, are storage units that can be added to a NAS solution via daisy chaining to increase the NAS' storage volume. A maximum of 4 DAS units can be added.

== Mobile Software ==
Thecus has introduced iOS and Android applications for remote access to their NAS.

Thecus Connect™ - gives users the ability to remotely control and check their NAS. It provides up-to-date information on their system's settings, if trouble emerges, smart alerts will notify the user and send reminders until the issue is resolved.

Thecus Wizard™ - allows quick set up a NAS remotely. On initial start up of the NAS, users can auto-configure their network settings, build RAID and set up private accounts.

Orbweb.me - a P2P module that allows users to view, stream and manage files in their NAS from any location, without needing an IP address.

== Conferences ==
Thecus regularly attends and hosts a booth at a number of major annual conferences related to electronics and storage.

CeBIT (Hanover, Germany) - The world's largest computer expo, located in Hanover, Germany. Thecus has attended annually since 2005.

Computex Taipei (Taipei, Taiwan) - The world's second largest computer expo and the largest in Asia, located in Taipei, Taiwan. Thecus has attended annually since 2005.

Thecus also attends global reseller events and tech expos throughout the year.

== See also ==
- List of companies of Taiwan
