= Broadberry Data Systems =

IT hardware supplier

- Type: Private (Limited liability)
- Industry: Storage Servers
- Founded: UK
- Headquarters: London, England, UK
- Products: Storage Servers, Rackmount Servers, Workstations

Broadberry Data Systems is an independent IT hardware supplier/integrator. The company's head office is based in Uxbridge, London, and it has a satellite sales office in the Midlands as well as two sales offices in the United States, one in Delaware and one in Florida.

== Business ==
While manufacturing and supplying computer servers, storage products, workstations, rackmount cabinets and blade servers, Broadberry Data Systems also provides service and support at both the pre- and post sales stages.

The company's core brands are its own manufactured Cyberstore-range of storage appliances, which include NAS, DAS and iSCSI SAN servers ranging from 2TB to over 100TB. The company also distributes the AcoustiRACK-range of low-noise server cabinets in the UK and the USA.

== History ==
Broadberry Data Systems was founded in October 1989 and initially consisted of only one sales office, which was based in Brentford, Middlesex. In August 2005, the company expanded and moved to a new purpose-built sales and manufacturing facility in Perivale. In January 2025, the company moved again to a new office in Uxbridge.

In March 2006, the first U.S. Broadberry sales office was opened in Delaware. In January 2007, second U.S. sales office opened in Florida.

== Acquisition ==
In October 2019, Broadberry Data Systems was acquired by Source Code Corporation, a private-equity backed manufacturer of server and storage devices based in Waltham, MA.
