= Highly Available STorage =

Distributed storage system

Highly Available Storage
- Original author: Pawel Jakub Dawidek
- Written in: C
- Operating system: FreeBSD
- Type: Distributed storage system
- License: FreeBSD License
- Website: wiki.freebsd.org/HAST

Highly Available Storage (HAST) is a protocol and tool set for FreeBSD written by Pawel Jakub Dawidek, a core FreeBSD developer.

HAST provides a block device to be synchronized between two servers for use as a file system. The two machines comprise a cluster, where each machine is a cluster node. HAST uses a Primary-Secondary (or Master-Slave) configuration, so only one cluster node is active at a time.

HAST-provided devices appear like disk devices in the /dev/hast/ directory in FreeBSD, and can be used like standard block devices. HAST is similar to a RAID1 (mirror) where each RAID component is provided across the network by one cluster node.

== See also ==
- Network block device
- DRBD (Distributed Replicated Block Device)
