= Jellyfin =

Media server software

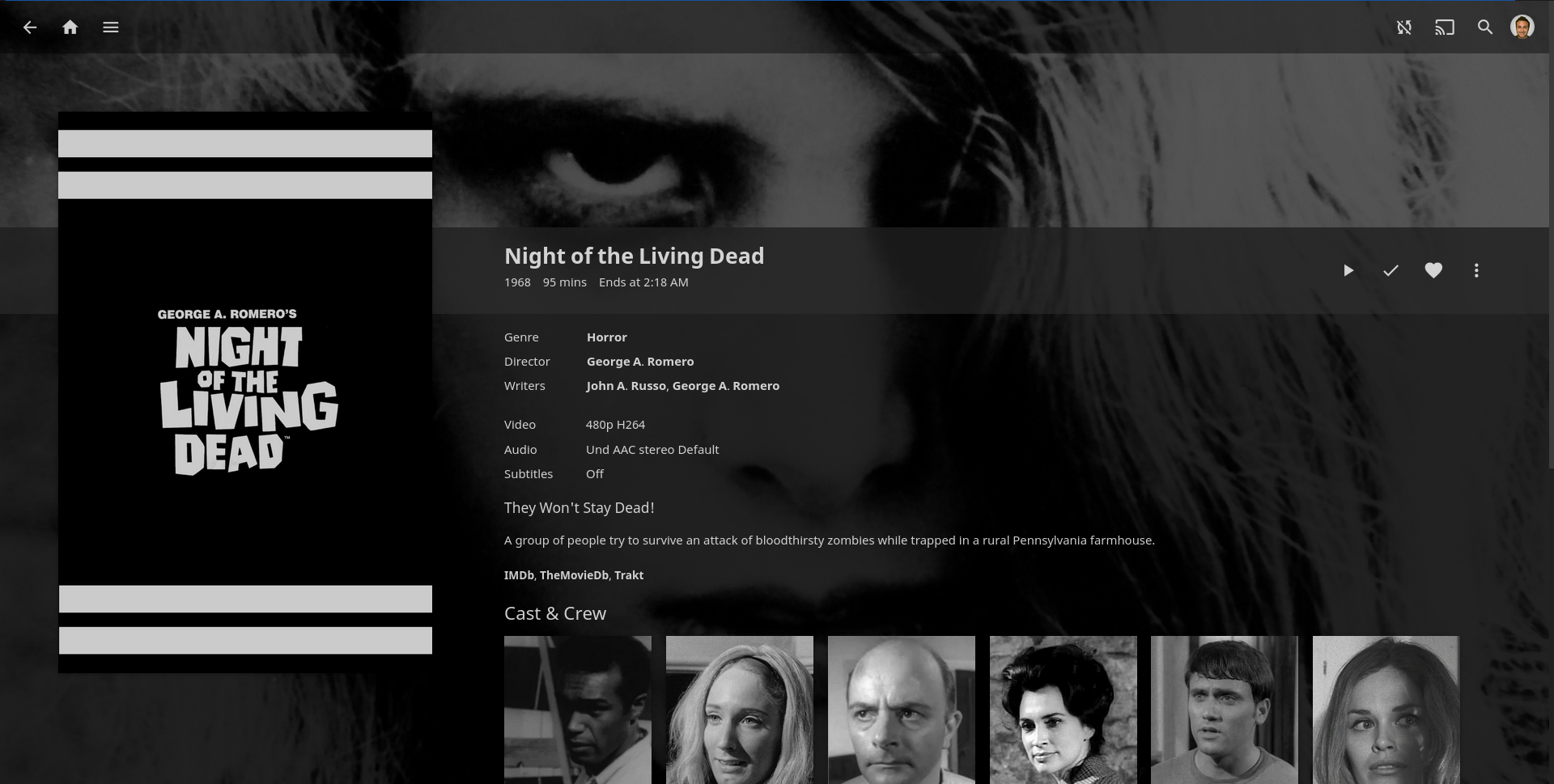
- Jellyfin v10.6.0 web client movie detail
- Developer: Jellyfin Team
- Release: December 30, 2018; 7 years ago
- Stable release: 12.4 / 26 October 2026; 26 days ago
- Written in: C# (server)
- Operating system: Cross-platform
- Platform: Linux, Windows, macOS, Android, iOS, iPadOS, Amazon Fire TV, Kodi, Roku, Xbox One, Xbox Series X/S, Docker
- Available in: Multiple languages
- Type: Media server
- License: GPLv2
- Website: jellyfin.org
- Repository: github.com/jellyfin/

Jellyfin is a free and open-source media server and suite of multimedia applications designed to organize, manage, and share digital media files to networked devices. Jellyfin consists of a server application installed on a machine running Linux, Microsoft Windows, or macOS; and another application running on a client device such as a smartphone, tablet, smart TV, streaming media player, game console or in a web browser. Jellyfin also can serve media to DLNA and Chromecast-enabled devices. It is a fork of Emby.

== Features ==
Jellyfin follows a client–server model that allows multiple users and clients to connect and stream digital media remotely. Because Jellyfin runs as a self-contained server, there is no subscription-based consumption model, and Jellyfin does not utilize an external connection nor third-party authentication for this functionality. This enables Jellyfin to work on an isolated intranet in much the same fashion as it does over the Internet. Because it shares a heritage with Emby, some clients for that platform are unofficially compatible with Jellyfin; however, as Jellyfin's codebase diverges from Emby, this becomes less possible. Jellyfin does not support a direct migration path from Emby.

Jellyfin is extensible, and optional third-party plugins exist to provide additional feature functionality. The project hosts an official repository, although plugins need not be hosted in the official repository to be installable.

Version 10.6.0 of the server software introduced a feature known as "SyncPlay", which provides functionality for multiple users to consume media content together in a synchronized fashion. Support to read epub-format ebooks with Jellyfin was also added, together with support for third-party plugin repositories, allowing users to create and install plugins without the need for the official repository. The web front-end has been split off in a separate system, in anticipation of the move towards a SQL back-end and high availability with multiple servers. Version 10.11.0, released in October 2025, completed the move of the library database to Entity Framework Core. The developers said this would later allow other database engines such as PostgreSQL, which were not yet officially supported at the time.

=== Clients ===
There are a number of Jellyfin clients that can be used to connect to a Jellyfin server via HTTP port 8096 or HTTPS port 8920 (in the default configuration). Jellyfin also can also act as a DLNA server (via a plugin) and send media to Chromecast-enabled devices.

Some notable clients include:

- Jellyfin Web
- Jellyfin Media Player for Windows, MacOS and Linux
- Apps for Android, iOS, iPadOS, Android TV and Fire TV, Roku devices, Xbox and LG televisions running WebOS
- An add-on for Kodi

== Development ==
The project began on December 8, 2018, when co-founders Andrew Rabert and Joshua Boniface, among other users, agreed to fork Emby in reaction to closing of open-source development on that project. Jellyfin's name, a reference to streaming, was conceived of by Rabert the following day. An initial release was made available on December 30, 2018.

=== Version history ===
Jellyfin's unique version numbering began with version 10.0.0 in January 2019.

Major version	Release date	Notes
12.0	September 7, 2026	Change in naming scheme. This release includes a "Still watching?" prompt, frame-by-frame playback, multiple versions of TV episodes, improved book support, improved recommendations and improved caching for the web browser
10.11.0	October 20, 2025	Due to being such a major release, the usual 6 month release schedule was not adhered to. New features include complete removal of ARM32 (armhf) support, improved search performance and HEVC decoding support for Firefox
10.10.0	October 27, 2024	Media segments (e.g. chapters in video files), Dolby Vision HDR, deprecated x32 bit ARM, deprecated Raspberry Pi V4L2, deprecated network paths
10.9.0	May 11, 2024	
10.8.0	June 11, 2022	
10.7.0	March 8, 2021	
10.6.0	July 19, 2020	Introduction of SyncPlay feature and EPUB reading
10.5.0	March 8, 2020	Hardware acceleration encoding and decoding support added for the Raspberry Pi
10.4.0	October 6, 2019	
10.3.0	April 19, 2019	
10.2.0	February 16, 2019	
10.1.0	January 25, 2019	
10.0.0	January 7, 2019	
3.5.2-5	December 30, 2018	Only release to use original Emby version numbering

Unsupported
Latest version
Future version

== See also ==
- Comparison of DVR software packages
- Plex
- Kodi (software)
- Emby
- Self-hosting (web services)
- Home theater PC
