= Ocarina Networks =

- Type: Subsidiary
- Industry: Data storage devices
- Predecessor: Ocarina Networks
- Founded: 2006
- Defunct: July 31, 2010
- Fate: Acquired by Dell
- Successor: Part of Dell Storage Fluid Data Architecture
- Headquarters: San Jose, California
- Products: Oca2400/3400/4600 optimizers, OcaReader, and other storage optimization products
- Owner: Dell
- Website: ocarinanetworks.com

Ocarina Networks was a technology company selling a hardware/software solution designed to reduce data footprints with file-aware storage optimization. A subsidiary of Dell, their flagship product, the Ocarina Appliance/Reader, released in April 2008, uses patented data compression techniques incorporating such methods as record linkage and context-based lossless data compression. The product includes the hardware-appliance-based compressor, the Ocarina Optimizer (Models 2400, 3400, 4600) and a real-time decompressor, the software-based Ocarina Reader.

== History ==
Ocarina was founded by

- Murli Thirumale, formerly a vice-president and general manager at Citrix Systems;
- Carter George, formerly a vice-president and co-founder of PolyServe (acquired by HP); and
- Goutham Rao, formerly Chief Technical Officer and Chief Architect for Advanced Solutions Group of Citrix Systems.

Its solution works by identifying redundancy at a global file system level, and applying specific algorithms for different data formats, such as algorithms specific to images, text, executables, seismic data, and other "unstructured data". Ocarina's Optimizers work with existing storage systems through standard network protocols such as NFS, or are directly integrated with partner vendors storage systems.

On July 19, 2010, Dell announced it plans to acquire Ocarina Networks. The transaction was completed on July 31, 2010. In late 2010, the original Ocarina Optimizer product family was removed from the market, enabling the Ocarina team to focus on the integration of dedupe and compression into Dell storage products. The most notable examples were the DR-family of deduplication appliances, launched in 2012, and integration of dedupe into Dell's Fluid File System.

== Technology ==
The company's ECOsystem (Extract, Correlate, Optimize) provided data reduction technology, providing both deduplication and content-aware data compression in a reliable, scalable, policy-based package. ECOsystem consists of 3 primary components, an optimizer, a reader, and a management and reporting framework. These components were delivered in software or appliance form depending on customer, application, and underlying storage solution.

The standard ECOsystem workflow was a post-process. Files were first stored to disk in native form. Policies are used to specify which files were to be optimized (based on age, location, or file type), and what compression settings to use. Policies were commonly used to avoid optimization of files that are actively being modified. ECOsystem could also be configured to migrate optimized data to a secondary tier of lower-cost storage for disk-based archival applications.

=== Compression and deduplication algorithms ===
ECOsystem was content aware, with selection of compression solution based on the type of data being processed. This went beyond file-extension filtering. ECOsystem recursively decomposed compound files, until elemental text, media, or binary components are identified. At the heart of the optimizer software is a context-weighted neural net that will apply the most effective compression solution based on the nature of the elemental file component identified, and will efficiently remember optimal settings based on similar files processed.

ECOsystem in most cases is highly effective at achieving results on novel or proprietary file-types, as well as pre-compressed media such as JPEG images and MPEG4 video. Ocarina successfully processed data in over 600 file formats to-date.

=== ECOmax and NFO workflows ===
Two forms of Ocarina's post-processing workflow were available:

- ECOmax and
- Native Format Optimization (NFO).

ECOmax utilized all available compression methods to shrink data, including on-disk structures that maximized utilization of physical blocks. The ECOmax workflow required the use of the ECOreader, which is run-anywhere software that efficiently decodes data for transparent read-back. ECOmax could be applied to any file or data types including specialized files used by various vertical industries.

The NFO workflow is designed specifically for web-based media companies. In NFO, media files (for example JPEGs) were stored in their native state, which eliminates the need for decoding, and allows customers to capture data-reduction benefits throughout the workflow, including web distribution (bandwidth savings and better end-user experience), and movement into archival systems. NFO provided "visually identical" compression that tailors image parameters to the sensitivities of the Human Visual System Model, and the intended use of the image, without creating any perceivable quality degradation.

Note that many of the features and capabilities of the Ocarina ECOsystem were not included in later Dell products.

== Funding ==
- In 2007, Ocarina Networks secured $12M in series 'A' funding from Kleiner Perkins Caufield & Byers and Highland Capital Partners,
- In 2009, Ocarina secured an additional $20M from the same investors and Jafco Ventures.
