= File virtualization =

In computing, file virtualization is a field of storage virtualization operating on computer file level. It involves uniting multiple storage devices into a single logical pool of file. It is a vital part of both file area network (FAN) and network file management (NFM) concepts.

As with most other virtualization designs, "a primary driver behind file virtualization is the desire to shield users and administrators from the complexity of the underlying storage environment. Other goals include simplified management, more efficient capacity usage and allocation, and reduced management costs".

Network file management (NFM) is a data storage management-related category. The term is used interchangeably with NAS virtualization and file virtualization among data storage industry press, analysts and system administrators.

The basic idea of NFM is that the rapid, ongoing growth of file data capacity on enterprise networks has led to massive management complexity and accelerating operating costs. NFM is the concept of creating a virtualization layer between the clients and the file servers (or NAS devices). By creating this abstraction layer, System Administrators may simplify the management of multiple storage devices, including non-disruptive movement of data between servers, preserving the client access path (pathname), policies for automating the placement of data according to its changing needs, and the ability to discover, analyze and report on server and file usage.
