= Direct-attached storage =

Data storage connected directly to a computer

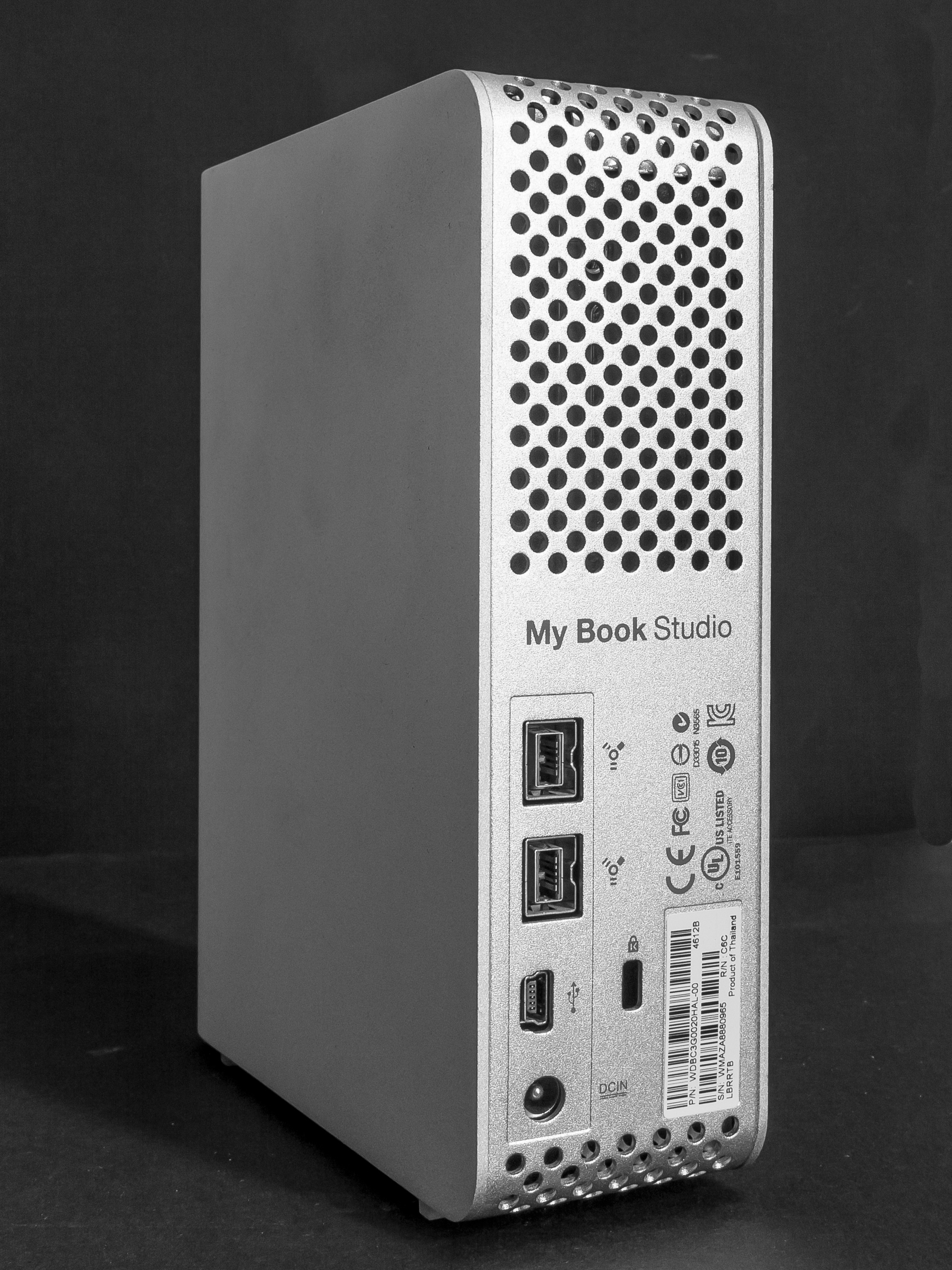
Typical DAS featuring USB and (legacy) Firewire connectors

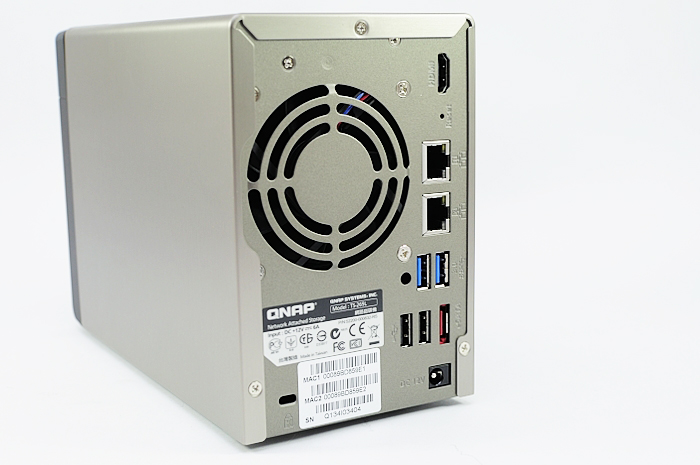
Typical NAS using ethernet for main connectivity

Direct-attached storage (DAS) is digital storage directly attached to the computer accessing it, as opposed to storage accessed over a computer network (i.e. network-attached storage). DAS consists of one or more storage units such as hard drives, solid-state drives, optical disc drives within an external enclosure. The term "DAS" is a retronym to contrast with storage area network (SAN) and network-attached storage (NAS).

== Features ==
A typical DAS system is made of a data storage device (for example enclosures holding a number of hard disk drives) connected directly to a computer through a host bus adapter (HBA). Between those two points there is no network device (like hub, switch, or router), and this is the main characteristic of DAS.

The main protocols used for DAS connections are Parallel ATA, SATA, eSATA, NVMe, Parallel SCSI, SAS, USB, and IEEE 1394.

== Storage features of SAN, DAS, and NAS ==
Most functions found in modern storage do not depend on whether the storage is attached directly to servers (DAS), or via a network (SAN and NAS). In enterprise environments, direct-attached storage systems can utilize storage devices that have higher endurance in terms of data workload capability, along with scalability in the amount of capacity that storage arrays can achieve compared to consumer-grade NAS and other storage devices.

== Advantages and disadvantages ==
The key difference between DAS and NAS is that DAS storage does not incorporate any network hardware and related operating environment to provide a facility to share storage resources independently of the host so is only available via the host to which the DAS is attached.

DAS is typically considered much faster than NAS due to lower latency in the type of host connection although contemporary network and direct connection throughput typically exceeds the raw read/write performance of the storage units themselves.

A SAN (storage area network) has more in common with a DAS than a NAS with the key difference being that DAS is a 1:1 relationship between storage and host whereas SAN is many to many.

== See also ==
- Secondary storage device versus tertiary storage device or nearline storage — storage that remains attached versus storage that is attached or detached as needed
- RAID
- JBOD
- Storage area network
- Network-attached storage
