= QNAP Systems =

Taiwanese network-attached storage company

QNAP Systems, Inc.

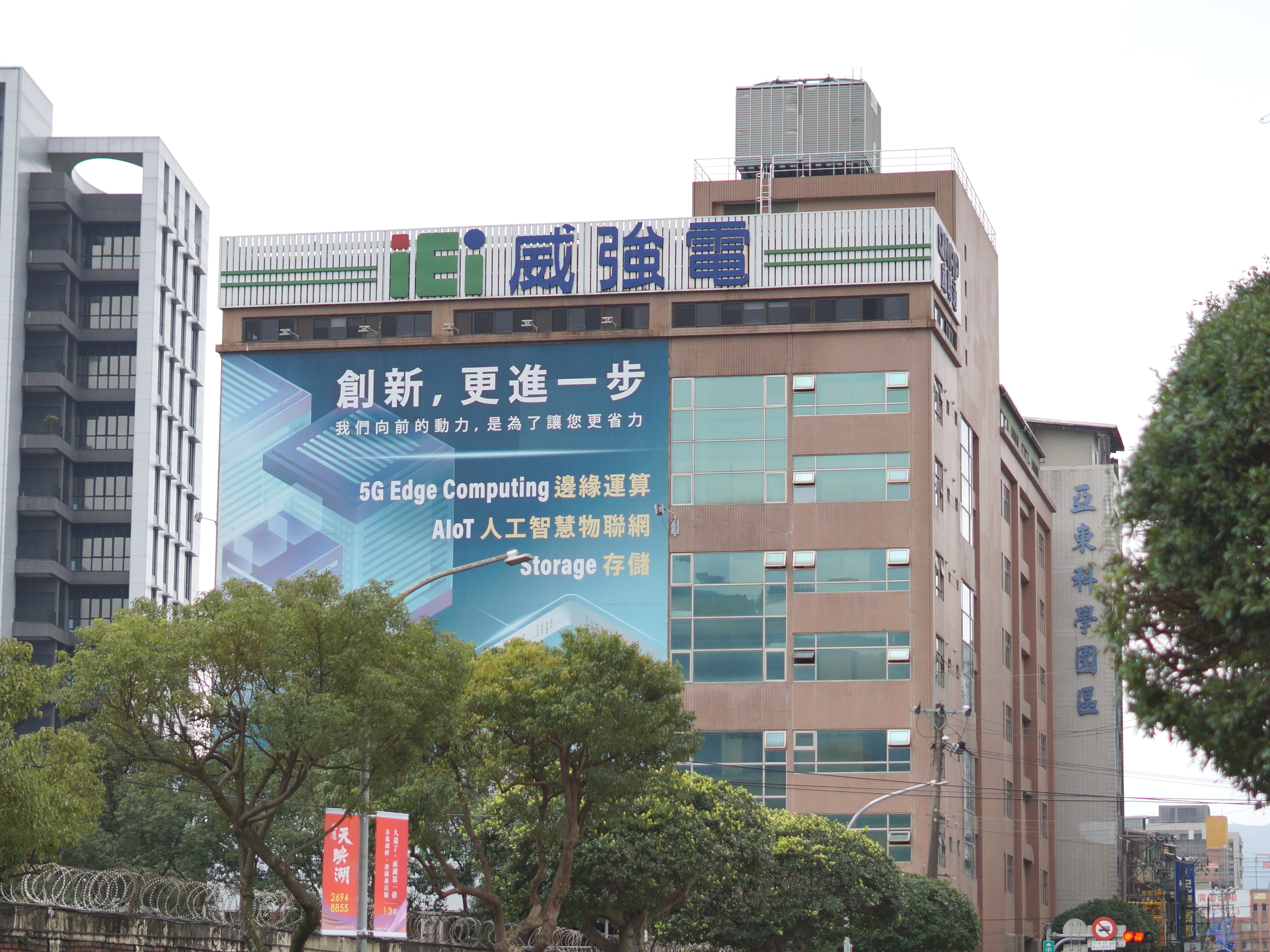
- QNAP and IEI Integration Corporation headquarters in Xizhi District, New Taipei City
- Native name: 威聯通科技股份有限公司
- Type: Private
- Industry: Network-attached storage Network video recorder Networking hardware
- Founded: April 1, 2004; 22 years ago (as a separate company)
- Founder: Teddy Kuo; Meiji Chang
- Headquarters: New Taipei City, Taiwan
- Area served: Worldwide
- Key people: Chairman: Teddy Kuo; General Manager: Meiji Chang
- Number of employees: 1,000+
- Subsidiaries: QNAP, Inc.
- Website: www.qnap.com

QNAP Systems, Inc. (Chinese: 威聯通科技) is a Taiwanese corporation that specializes in network-attached storage (NAS) appliances used for file sharing, virtualization, storage management and surveillance applications. Headquartered in Xizhi District, New Taipei City, Taiwan, QNAP has offices in 16 countries and employs over 1,000 people around the world. QNAP became a member of the Intel Intelligent Systems Alliance in 2011.

== Company history ==
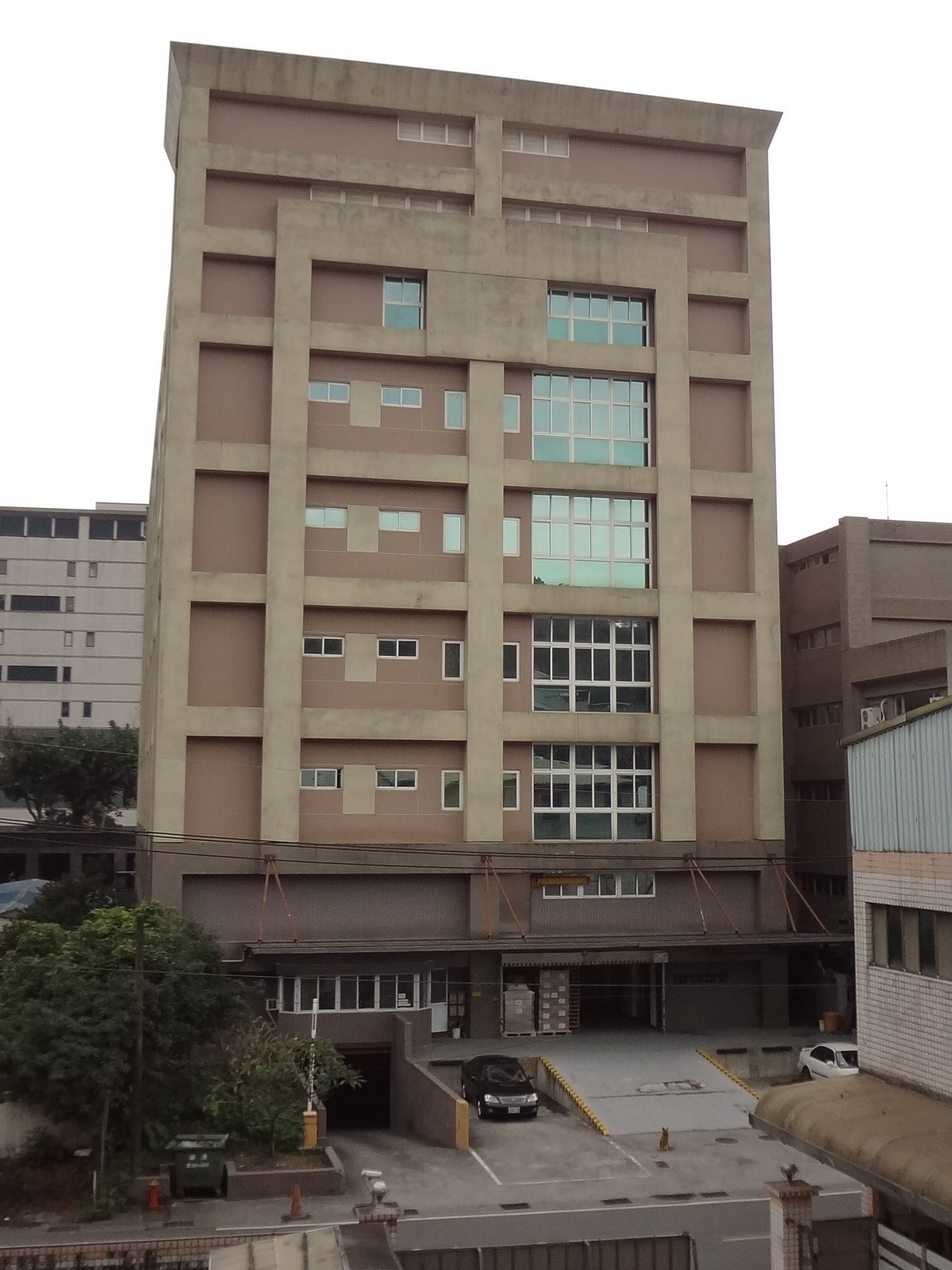
QNAP Qidu Plant in Qidu District, Keelung, Taiwan

QNAP, which stands for Quality Network Appliance Provider, originally existed as a department within the IEI Integration Corporation, an industrial computing service provider located in Taiwan. In 2004, QNAP Systems Inc. was spun off into a separate company.

== Product overview ==
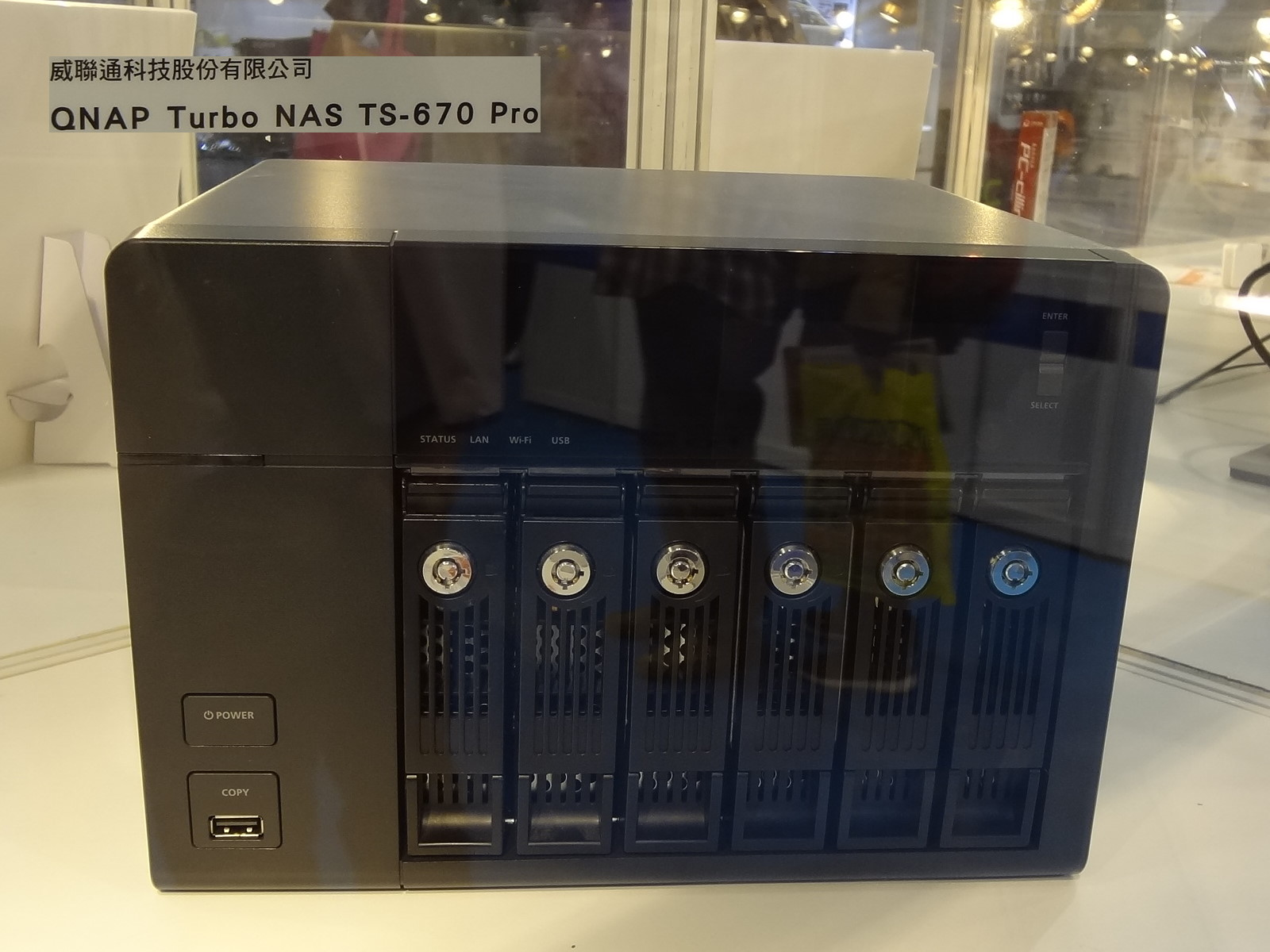
QNAP Turbo NAS TS-670 Pro

QNAP primarily produces Network-Attached Storage (NAS) appliances. The company also produces Network Video Recorders (NVR) and a series of networking equipment.

- QTS – an operating system for NAS devices
- QES (QNAP Enterprise Storage)
- QuTS hero – an operating system similar to QTS that implements ZFS
- QuTScloud
- QNE
- QSS
- QuRouter
- The QNAP QHora-301W supports high-speed Wi-Fi 6 and 10GbE connections, while also providing an enterprise-grade SD-WAN VPN to allow multi-site VPN deployment via the cloud.

== Vulnerabilities and attacks ==
In 2021, SAM security group reported that it had discovered critical vulnerabilities in QNAP NAS devices. SAM security group said that these would mean that remote attackers could "execute arbitrary shell commands ... [or] create arbitrary file data on any (non-existing) location ... [or] execute arbitrary commands on the remote NAS". The company said that it had informed QNAP of the vulnerabilities in 2020 but that, four months after being informed, QNAP had not addressed them. The article was later updated to clarify that QNAP had resolved the problems for the most recent devices, but not for older systems, and then that QNAP had revised and released firmware for older devices.

These critical vulnerabilities were reported by Bleeping Computer to be implicated in a massive ransomware attack on QNAP NAS devices in April 2021. This attack, named "Qlocker", compressed all files smaller than 20 MiB into 7z files using 7-Zip with a 32 character long password. In order to retrieve the password, users had to access an .onion webpage and pay 0.01 BTC. This cost users at least US$260,000.

In January 2022, some QNAP NAS devices were affected by a ransomware infection known as DeadBolt. There were further attacks in March and May 2022.

== Achievements ==
2019

- TS-1677X named Best NAS Device of European Hardware Awards 2019

2018

- Received the COMPUTEX Best Choice Award 2018

2017

- TS-451+ named Best NAS Device of European Hardware Awards 2017

2016

- Received the COMPUTEX Best Choice Award 2016

2014

- Received ISO 27001:2013 certification in information security management
- Received 2014 iF Product Design Award
- Featured in PCWorld's 50 Best Tech Products of 2013

== See also ==
- List of companies of Taiwan
