= Synology =

Taiwanese corporation specializing in NAS devices

Coordinates: 25.0792°N 121.5427°E

Synology, Inc.
- Native name: 群暉科技股份有限公司
- Type: Private
- Industry: Network-attached storage
- Founded: January 2000
- Founder: Cheen Liao; Philip Wong
- Headquarters: Banqiao, New Taipei, Taiwan
- Area served: Worldwide
- Key people: Vic Hsu (CEO); Philip Wong (Chairman)
- Products: Storage virtualization; Computer software; Blade servers; Consumer electronics; Wireless routers; Video management system
- Subsidiaries: Synology America Corp.; Synology France SARL; Synology GmbH; Synology UK Ltd
- Website: www.synology.com

Synology Inc. (Chinese: 群暉科技; pinyin: Qúnhuī Kējì) is a Taiwanese corporation that specializes in network-attached storage (NAS) appliances. Synology's line of NAS is known as the DiskStation for desktop models, FlashStation for all-flash models, and RackStation for rack-mount models. Synology's products are distributed worldwide and localized in several languages. Synology's headquarters are located in Taipei, Taiwan, with subsidiaries located around the world.

In 2018, product review website Wirecutter described Synology as a "longtime leader in the small-business and home NAS arena," albeit still a newcomer in the field of Wi-Fi routers. For years, Synology NAS units supported third-party hard drives, giving users the freedom to choose from various brands and capacities. That changed in 2025, when Synology started locking its NAS devices to only accept Synology-branded hard drives, effectively ending their long-standing tradition of open drive compatibility. With the release of DSM 7.3 in October 2025, Synology reversed its lock on only allowing NAS devices manufactured in 2025 (i.e. - DS425, DS225, etc.) to use Synology-branded hard drives (HDD) and once again third party hard drives can be used, but M.2 drives are still locked to Synology's own brand.

== Company history ==
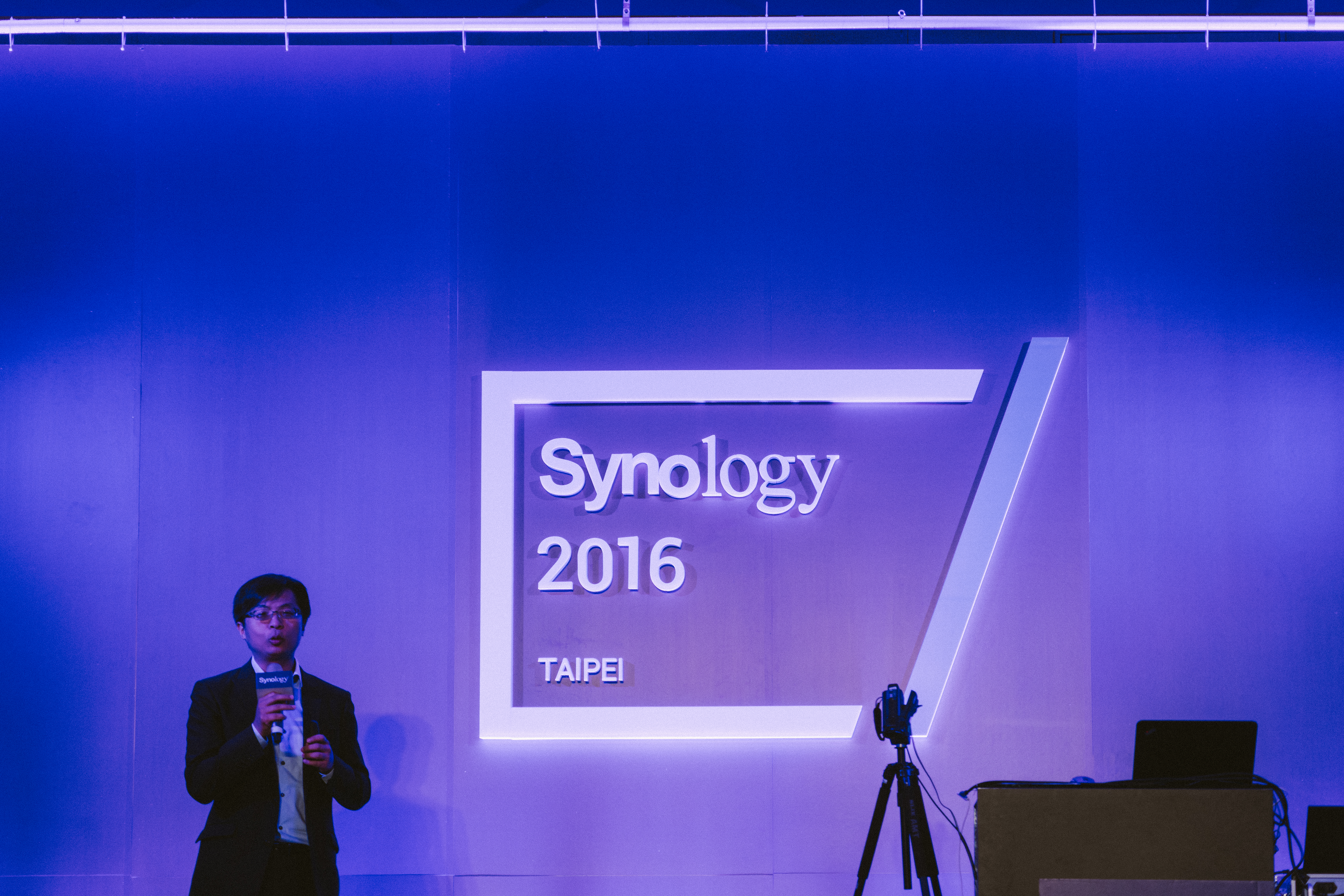
Derren Lu in 2016; at that time, he was the CTO of Synology.

Synology Inc. was founded in 2000 after Cheen Liao and Philip Wong left Microsoft to pursue an independent project. Liao was a development manager in the Microsoft Exchange Server Group, while Wong was a Sales Director for Microsoft in Taiwan. Liao had joined Microsoft in 1989 and worked at the Redmond campus. At Microsoft, Wong is credited with contacting Cher Wang to propose licensing Windows CE to First International Computer; Wang would later found HTC. However, Wong felt that Taiwanese OEMs were doing most of the work for foreign brands, and left Microsoft; when Liao was visiting his mother in Taiwan, Wong convinced him to found Synology, naming the company by taking one character from each of their names.

Liao brought the Microsoft software development process to Taiwan, requiring that all code be reviewed by two other software engineers, and the code would not pass until the reviewing engineers endorsed the logic. At Synology, Liao and Wong wrote a new operating system called Filer OS based on Berkeley Software Distribution (BSD), which was to be used with Fastora NAS hardware to create a NAS solution. Three years after founding the company, they shifted from exclusively licensed software to adding hardware design and production, since the hardware partners who had been licensing the software had inconsistent quality control; diagnosing failures required Synology's active participation, and as a new company, Synology had difficulty in gaining trust and recognition. To vertically integrate their NAS software tightly with hardware, Synology released its first complete solution in 2004, the DiskStation DS-101. Initially, Synology targeted the power user and small to medium-sized business markets, as the high-end market for NAS solutions was dominated by EMC Corporation and NetApp. To expand its market share in the United States, Liao decided to send gift baskets to popular review outlets, containing custom-printed chocolates with the Synology name.

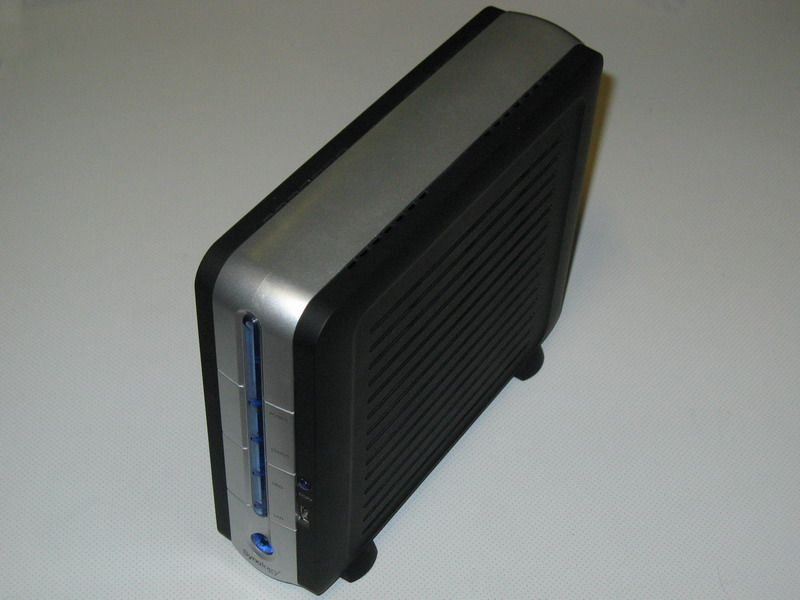
Synology DS-101, Rev. 3

In 2007, Wong implemented a "rotating CEO system", in which a few senior employees served terms as the CEO; Wong returned as CEO in 2019. Liao and Wong are still with the company, with Liao serving as President of Synology America Corp. and Wong serving Chairman of Synology Inc. By 2014, revenue exceeded NT$10 billion. Synology has grown from approximately 40 employees, as of 2008, to 600 employees in its Taiwan offices in 2017, of which 200 were software development engineers. Synology expanded beyond its roots in peripheral storage market by introducing a cloud service in 2017, initially using three data centers in Frankfurt, Germany. In 2018, Wong stated that Synology's profits were "in the same neighborhood as ASUS", which were approximately NT$4.2 billion that year. The company consolidated its Taiwan offices and headquarters in 2019, moving from offices on Chang'an West Road and Chengde Road in Datong District, Taipei, near the Museum of Contemporary Art Taipei, and Taipei Main Station, to the Far Eastern Telecom Park (Tpark) in Banqiao District.

== Products ==
Synology uses an alphanumeric naming convention; the product name is two alphabetical characters followed by a three- or four-digit number, with an optional suffix attached. The alphabetical characters give the product category; for storage products, the first (hundreds place) digit is the number of internal drive bays, and the last two digits (tens and ones) is the year the product is intended to be sold. The suffix can be a character, such as "+" to indicate increased performance over the suffix-free equivalent model, or a letter, such as "j", which is attached to entry-level products.

For example, the DS211+ is a DiskStation (NAS) with two drive bays, released in 2011, with enhanced performance. After Synology released NAS expansion chassis (DX and RXnnn), this scheme was modified slightly to incorporate a four-digit number in the product name; the first digit(s) (hundreds and thousands, if present) indicate the total number of drives supported. For example, the DS723+ has two internal drive bays, but it can be connected to the DX517 five-drive expansion chassis, supporting a total of seven drives.

=== Storage ===
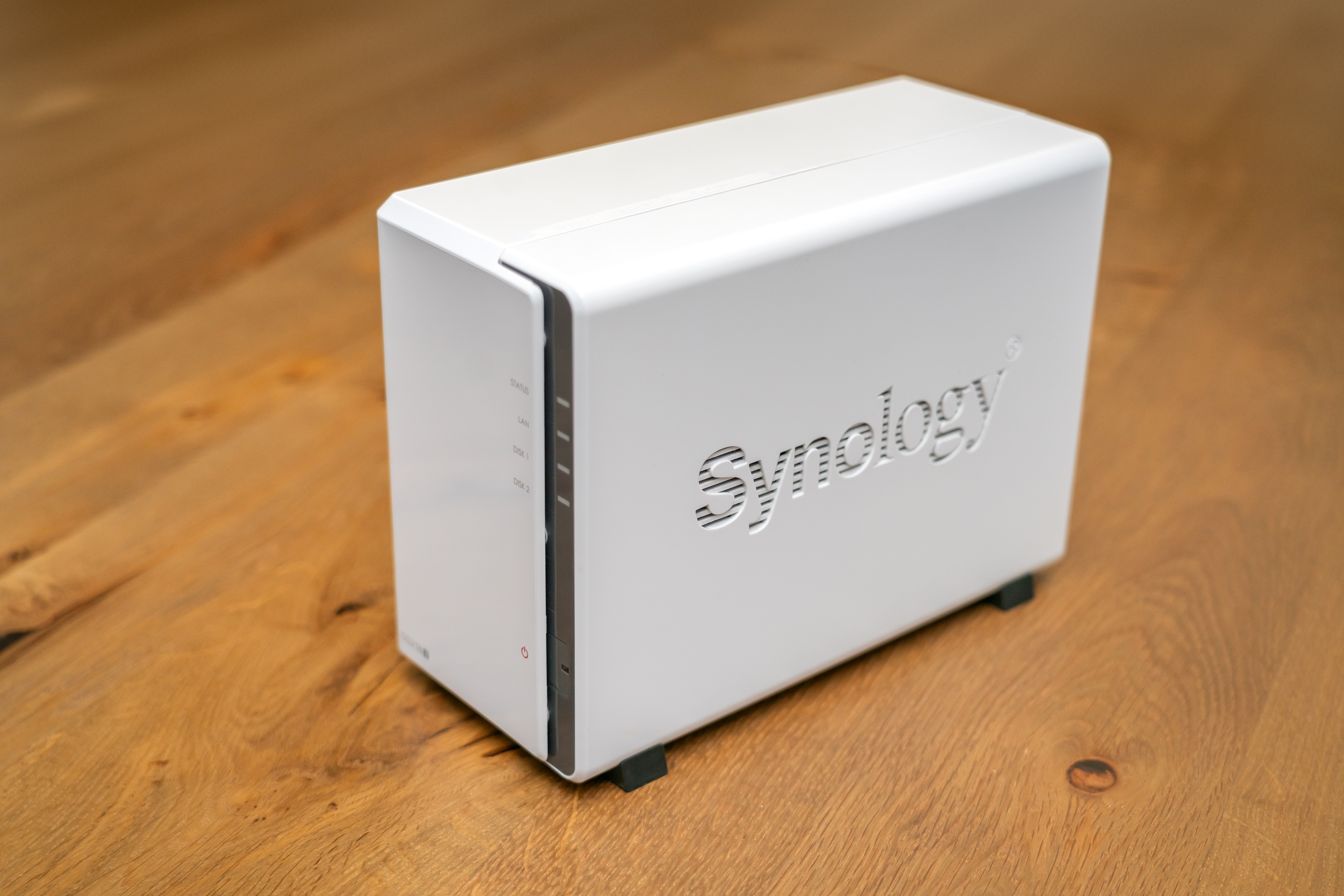
NAS: Synology Disk Station DS223J

Consumer- and small/home business-oriented NAS products by Synology are sold under the DS (DiskStation) line, while larger businesses may choose the RS (RackStation) line of rack-mounted units; the corresponding expansion chassis include the DX (Disk eXpander) and RX (Rack eXpander), introduced in 2009. Synology also marketed a CS (CubeStation) line of four-bay storage products, with the approximate shape of a cube, but later folded these into the DS line.

In a review for SmallNetBuilder, Jim Buzbee was "impressed with the maturity of the DS-101's software and documentation" but felt the main negatives were "high cost and limited availability". In addition, Synology sells FS/FX (FlashStation), HD (High Density), SA (Scalable Architecture), and UC (Uptime Critical) networked storage products for larger businesses, housed in rack-mountable units.

==== DiskStation Manager ====
DiskStation Manager (DSM) is a Linux-based operating system developed by Synology for its NAS products. Synology's software architecture allows for third-party add-on application integration. Hundreds of third-party applications are available in addition to Synology's own catalog. Command line access via SSH or Telnet is available. Access to development tools and APIs are also available on Synology's website. Third-party applications can be written in an interpreted programming language such as PHP or compiled to binary format. Public APIs allow custom applications to integrate into Synology's web-based user interface. Installers using the SPK format can install third-party applications directly on the DSM operating system.

==== Vulnerabilities ====
In 2014, a piece of ransomware emerged, dubbed "Synolocker," that targeted Synology NAS devices running DSM versions 4.0, 4.2, and 4.3. Synology fixed the vulnerabilities in November and December 2013.

=== Networking ===
Synology sells wireless routers (RT) and wireless mesh routers (MR, WRX). For these products, the numbers following the product class indicate the speed class and Wi-Fi technology; for example, RT1900ac is an 802.11ac router with 1900 Mbit/s maximum combined throughput. Synology routers are managed either through a browser-accessible software interface called SRM (Synology Router Manager), similar in appearance to DSM, or a smartphone application named DS Router.

== See also ==
- List of companies of Taiwan
