= Network-attached storage =

Computer data storage server

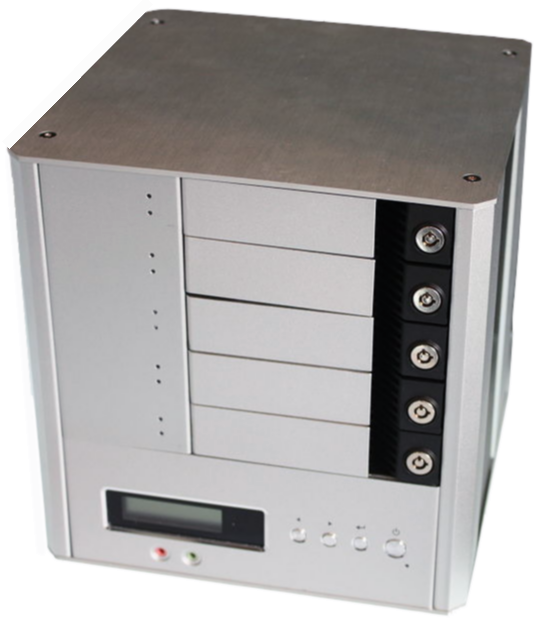
A five-bay NAS server

Network-attached storage (NAS; pronounced naz) is a file-level computer data storage server connected to a computer network providing data access to a heterogeneous group of clients. In this context, the term "NAS" can refer to both the technology and systems involved, or a specialized computer appliance device unit built for such functionality – a NAS appliance or NAS box. NAS contrasts with block-level, storage area networks (SAN) and direct-attached storage (DAS).

== Overview ==
A NAS device is optimised for serving files either by its hardware, software, or configuration. It is often manufactured as a computer appliance – a purpose-built specialized computer. NAS systems are networked appliances that contain one or more storage drives, often arranged into logical, redundant storage containers or Redundant Array of Independent Disks (RAID). Network-attached storage typically provide access to files using network file sharing protocols such as NFS, SMB, or AFP. From the mid-1990s, NAS devices began gaining popularity as a convenient method of sharing files among multiple computers, as well as to remove the responsibility of file serving from other servers on the network; by doing so, a NAS can provide faster data access, easier administration, and simpler configuration as opposed to using general-purpose server to serve files.

Accompanying a NAS are purpose-built hard disk drives, which are functionally similar to non-NAS drives but may have different firmware, vibration tolerance, or power dissipation to make them more suitable for use in RAID arrays, a technology often used in NAS implementations. For example, some NAS versions of drives support a command extension to allow extended error recovery to be disabled. In a non-RAID application, it may be important for a disk drive to go to great lengths to successfully read a problematic storage block, even if it takes several seconds. In an appropriately configured RAID array, a single bad block on a single drive can be recovered completely via the redundancy encoded across the RAID set. If a drive spends several seconds executing extensive retries it might cause the RAID controller to flag the drive as "down" whereas if it simply replied promptly that the block of data had a checksum error, the RAID controller would use the redundant data on the other drives to correct the error and continue without any problem.

== Description ==
A NAS unit is a computer connected to a network which provides only file-based data storage services to other devices on the network. Although it may technically be possible to run other software on a NAS unit, it is usually not designed to be a general-purpose server. For example, NAS units usually do not have a keyboard or display, and are controlled and configured over the network, often using a browser.

A full-featured operating system is not needed on a NAS device, so often a stripped-down operating system is used.

NAS systems contain one or more hard disk drives, often arranged into logical, redundant storage containers or RAID.

NAS uses file-based protocols such as NFS (popular on UNIX systems), SMB (Server Message Block) (used with Microsoft Windows systems), AFP (used with Apple Macintosh computers), or NCP (used with OES and Novell NetWare). NAS units rarely limit clients to a single protocol.

=== Comparing with DAS ===
The key difference between direct-attached storage (DAS) and NAS is that the former is simply an extension to an existing server and is not necessarily networked. As the name suggests, DAS typically is connected via a USB or Thunderbolt enabled cable. NAS is designed as an easy and self-contained solution for sharing files over the network.

Both DAS and NAS can potentially increase availability of data by using RAID or clustering.

Both NAS and DAS can have various amount of cache memory, which greatly affects performance. When comparing use of NAS with use of local (non-networked) DAS, the performance of NAS depends mainly on the speed of and congestion on the network.

Most NAS solutions will include the option to install a wide array of software applications to allow better configuration of the system or to include other capabilities outside of storage (like video surveillance, virtualization, media, etc). DAS typically is focused solely on data storage but capabilities can be available based on specific vendor options.

=== Comparing with SAN ===
Visual differentiation of NAS and SAN use in network architecture

NAS provides both storage and a file system. This is often contrasted with SAN (storage area network), which provides only block-based storage and leaves file system concerns on the "client" side. SAN protocols include Fibre Channel, iSCSI, ATA over Ethernet (AoE) and HyperSCSI.

One way to loosely conceptualize the difference between a NAS and a SAN is that NAS appears to the client OS (operating system) as a file server (the client can map network drives to shares on that server) whereas a disk available through a SAN still appears to the client OS as a disk, visible in disk and volume management utilities (along with client's local disks), and available to be formatted with a file system and mounted.

Despite their differences, SAN and NAS are not mutually exclusive and may be combined as a SAN–NAS hybrid, offering both file-level protocols (NAS) and block-level protocols (SAN) from the same system. A shared-disk file system can also be run on top of a SAN to provide filesystem services.

== History ==
In the early 1980s, the "Newcastle Connection" by Brian Randell and his colleagues at Newcastle University demonstrated and developed remote file access across a set of UNIX machines. Novell's NetWare server operating system and NCP protocol was released in 1983. Following the Newcastle Connection, Sun Microsystems' 1984 release of NFS allowed network servers to share their storage space with networked clients. 3Com and Microsoft would develop the LAN Manager software and protocol to further this new market. 3Com's 3Server and 3+Share software was the first purpose-built server (including proprietary hardware, software, and multiple disks) for open systems servers.

Inspired by the success of file servers from Novell, IBM, and Sun, several firms developed dedicated file servers. While 3Com was among the first firms to build a dedicated NAS for desktop operating systems, Auspex Systems was one of the first to develop a dedicated NFS server for use in the UNIX market. A group of Auspex engineers split away in the early 1990s to create the integrated NetApp FAS, which supported both the Windows SMB and the UNIX NFS protocols and had superior scalability and ease of deployment. This started the market for proprietary NAS devices now led by NetApp and EMC Celerra.

Starting in the early 2000s, a series of startups emerged offering alternative solutions to single filer solutions in the form of clustered NAS – Spinnaker Networks (acquired by NetApp in February 2004), Exanet (acquired by Dell in February 2010), Gluster (acquired by RedHat in 2011), ONStor (acquired by LSI in 2009), IBRIX (acquired by HP), Isilon (acquired by EMC – November 2010), PolyServe (acquired by HP in 2007), and Panasas, to name a few.

In 2009, NAS vendors (notably CTERA networks and Netgear) began to introduce online backup solutions integrated in their NAS appliances, for online disaster recovery.

By 2021, three major types of NAS solutions are offered (all with hybrid cloud models where data can be stored both on-premise on the NAS and off site on a separate NAS or through a public cloud service provider). The first type of NAS is focused on consumer needs with lower-cost options that typically support 1–5 hot plug hard drives. The second is focused on small-to-medium-sized businesses – these NAS solutions range from 2–24+ hard drives and are typically offered in tower or rackmount form factors. Pricing can vary greatly depending on the processor, components, and overall features supported. The last type is geared toward enterprises or large businesses and are offered with more advanced software capabilities. NAS solutions are typically sold without hard drives installed to allow the buyer (or IT departments) to select the hard drive cost, size, and quality.

== Implementation ==
The way manufacturers make NAS devices can be classified into three types:

1. Computer-based NAS – using a computer (server level or a personal computer) with processors typically from ARM, Intel, or AMD, installs FTP/SMB/AFP... software server. The power consumption of this NAS type is the largest, but its functions are the most powerful. Some large NAS manufacturers such as Synology, QNAP, Asustor, TerraMaster, and Ugreen make these types of devices. Max FTP throughput speed varies by computer CPU and amount of RAM.
2. Embedded-system-based NAS – using an ARM- or MIPS-based processor architecture and a real-time operating system (RTOS) or an embedded operating system to run a NAS server. The power consumption of this NAS type is fair, and functions in the NAS can fit most end-user requirements. Marvell, Oxford, and Storlink make chipsets for this type of NAS. Max FTP throughput varies from 20 MB/s to 120 MB/s.
3. ASIC-based NAS – provisioning NAS through the use of a single ASIC chip, using hardware to implement TCP/IP and file system. There is no OS in the chip, as all the performance-related operations are done by hardware acceleration circuits. The power consumption of this type of NAS is low, as functions are limited to only support SMB and FTP. LayerWalker is the only chipset manufacturer for this type of NAS. Max FTP throughput is 40 MB/s.

== Uses ==
NAS is useful for more than just general centralized storage provided to client computers in environments with large amounts of data. NAS can enable simpler and lower cost systems such as load-balancing and fault-tolerant email and web server systems by providing storage services. In the consumer market, NAS devices have evolved into "private cloud" solutions. They allow users to store multimedia data and back up files from various devices (such as smartphones and PCs) while retaining full data ownership. Unlike public cloud services, these private cloud setups typically do not require monthly subscription fees for storage capacity. Such consumer market appliances are now commonly available. Unlike their rackmounted counterparts, they are generally packaged in smaller form factors. The price of NAS appliances has fallen sharply in recent years, offering flexible network-based storage to the home consumer market for little more than the cost of a regular USB or FireWire external hard disk. Many of these home consumer devices are built around ARM, x86 or MIPS processors running an embedded Linux operating system.

A purpose-built backup appliance (PBBA) is a kind of NAS intended for storing backup data. PBBAs typically include data deduplication, compression, RAID 6 or other redundant hardware components, and automated maintenance. A PBBA may also be called a backup and disaster recovery appliance or simply a backup appliance.

== Examples ==
=== Open-source server implementations ===
Open-source NAS-oriented distributions of Linux and FreeBSD are available. These are designed to be easy to set up on commodity PC hardware, and are typically configured using a web browser.

They can run from a virtual machine, Live CD, bootable USB flash drive (Live USB), or from one of the mounted hard drives. They run Samba (an SMB daemon), NFS daemon, and FTP daemons which are freely available for those operating systems.

=== Network-attached secure disks ===
Network-attached secure disks (NASD) is 1997–2001 research project of Carnegie Mellon University, with the goal of providing cost-effective scalable storage bandwidth. NASD reduces the overhead on the file server (file manager) by allowing storage devices to transfer data directly to clients. Most of the file manager's work is offloaded to the storage disk without integrating the file system policy into the disk. Most client operations like Read/Write go directly to the disks; less frequent operations like authentication go to the file manager. Disks transfer variable-length objects instead of fixed-size blocks to clients. The File Manager provides a time-limited cachable capability for clients to access the storage objects. A file access from the client to the disks has the following sequence:

1. The client authenticates itself with the file manager and requests for the file access.
2. If the client can be granted access to the file requested, the client receives the network location of NASD disks and their capability.
3. If the client is accessing the disk for the first time, it receives a time-limited key for the establishment of secure communication to the disk.
4. The file manager informs the corresponding disk using an independent channel.
5. From now on, the client directly accesses the NASD disks by giving the capability it received and further data transfers go through the network, bypassing the file manager.

=== List of network protocols used to serve NAS ===
- Andrew File System (AFS)
- Apple Filing Protocol (AFP)
- File Transfer Protocol (FTP)
- Hypertext Transfer Protocol (HTTP)
- Network File System (NFS)
- rsync
- Server Message Block (SMB)
- SSH file transfer protocol (SFTP)
- Universal Plug and Play (UPnP)

== Clustered NAS ==
A clustered NAS is a NAS that is using a distributed file system running simultaneously on multiple servers. The key difference between a clustered and traditional NAS is the ability to distribute (e.g. stripe) data and metadata across the cluster nodes or storage devices. Clustered NAS, like a traditional one, still provides unified access to the files from any of the cluster nodes, unrelated to the actual location of the data.

== See also ==
- Disk enclosure
- File virtualization
- List of NAS manufacturers
- Network architecture
