= Comparison of OpenSolaris distributions =

Technical variations of Solaris distributions include support for different hardware devices and systems or software package configurations. Organizational differences may be motivated by historical reasons. Other criteria include security, including how quickly security upgrades are available; ease of package management; and number of packages available.

These tables compare each noteworthy distribution's latest stable release on wide-ranging objective criteria. It does not cover each operating system's subjective merits, branches marked as unstable or beta, nor compare Solaris distributions with other operating systems.

== General ==
Basic general information about the distributions: creator or producer, release date and latest version, and so forth.

Distribution	Developer	First public release	Based on	Latest release date	Status	Purpose	Cost
BeleniX	?	?	OpenSolaris, GNU	0.7.1 – July 19, 2008	Discontinued	?	Gratis
Nexenta OS	Nexenta Systems	2005	OpenSolaris, GNU, Ubuntu	3.1.3.5 (October 31, 2012; 13 years ago) [±]	Discontinued	?	Gratis
NexentaStor	Nexenta Systems	?	Nexenta OS	5.5-FP4, January 2025	Active	“Enterprise Grade Unified Block & File Storage”	Commercial
OmniOSce	OmniTI, OmniOSce Association	2012	illumos, GNU	r151058 (May 4, 2026)	Active	“Produce a self-hosting, minimalist Illumos-based release suitable for production deployment”	Gratis
OpenIndiana	illumos Foundation et al.	2010	illumos, OpenSolaris, GNU	Hipster 2026.04 (May 5, 2025; 12 months ago) [±]	Active	“Ensure the continued availability of an openly developed distribution based on OpenSolaris”	Gratis
SmartOS	Joyent	?	illumos, GNU	20260528T000227Z, May 2026	Active	Cloud computing (“converged container and virtual machine hypervisor”)	Gratis
Tribblix	Peter Tribble	?	illumos	0m37, Aug 2025	Active	An operating system distribution derived from OpenSolaris, OpenIndiana, and illumos, with a retro style and modern components	Gratis
v9os	Alexander Eremin	?	illumos	2018-10-01	Active	“Server-only, IPS-based minimal SPARC distribution of illumos”	Gratis
Distribution	Developer	First public release	Based on	Latest release date	Status	Purpose	Cost

== Technical ==
Distribution	Supported architectures	Install-time desktop environment selection
BeleniX	x86, x86-64	KDE, Xfce
Nexenta OS	x86, x86-64	GNOME
NexentaStor	x86(-64?)	?
OmniOS	x86, x86-64	none
OpenIndiana	x86, x86-64	MATE
SmartOS	x86-64	none
Tribblix	x86-64, SPARC	Xfce
v9os	SPARC	none
Distribution	Supported architectures	Install-time desktop environment selection

== Package management and installation ==
Information on features in the distributions. Package numbers are only approximate.

Distribution	Approximate number of packages	Package format/tools	Default installer	Graphical installation procedure
BeleniX	?	RPM	?	?
Nexenta OS	?	APT	?	?
NexentaStor	?	?	?	?
OmniOS	1032	IPS	Kayak	No
OpenIndiana	4600	IPS	Caiman	Yes
SmartOS	?	pkgsrc/pkgin	N/A (live system)	N/A
Tribblix	130	SVR4	N/A (live system)	N/A
v9os	?	IPS	?	No
Distribution	Approximate number of packages	Package format/tools	Default installer	Graphical installation procedure

== See also ==
- Comparison of operating systems
- Comparison of open-source operating systems
