= ZFS (disambiguation) =

ZFS is a file system and logical volume manager initially for the Sun Solaris operating system.

ZFS may also refer to:

== Computing ==
- zFS (z/OS file system), by IBM
- zFS (IBM file system project), an experimental decentralized file system
- ZFS+, ZFS with proprietary data de-duplication technology extensions by GreenBytes
- Oracle ZFS, a proprietary version of ZFS for Oracle Solaris
- OpenZFS, an open-source derivative of Oracle ZFS

== Other uses ==
- Zurich Financial Services
- Zero field splitting, a spectroscopic concept
