= BeleniX =

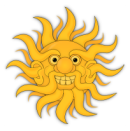
- Belenix logo
- OS family: Unix
- Working state: Dormant
- Latest release: 0.7.1 / July 19, 2008
- Kernel type: Unix
- Userland: GNU and traditional Solaris
- Default user interface: KDE
- License: CDDL
- Official website: http://www.belenix.org/

BeleniX is a discontinued operating system distribution built using the OpenSolaris source base. It can be used as a Live CD as well as installed to a hard disk. Initially developed as a Live CD along the lines of Knoppix to showcase OpenSolaris technologies, Belenix went on to become the initial base for Sun's OpenSolaris distribution. A number of technologies pioneered in the Belenix project have gone on to become full projects in their own right within the OpenSolaris ecosystem.

== Design and principles ==
BeleniX aims to have the latest stable revisions of most software, and packages are continuously pushed in the package repository with this aim in mind. However, in many cases bleeding-edge software is pushed out to help validate it and try out new features. Due to these reasons BeleniX also includes a lot of third-party drivers that may not be found in the official OpenSolaris distribution from Sun.

While the focus of BeleniX is on the developer desktop, it is also stable and scalable enough to work as a workstation or development server environment. This is mainly due to the underlying OpenSolaris kernel and userland environment.

BeleniX is compiled only for 32-bit execution (at i586/Pentium opcode based). However, references from the BeleniX team members have indicated that as of BeleniX 0.7, their live CD contains both 32-bit and 64-bit installation files.

BeleniX is focused on using KDE for its desktop environment, although Xfce has also been supported since the beginning of the distribution. An upcoming release will also include first-class support for GNOME. The BeleniX dev team includes other OpenSolaris based distros such as MilaX, Nexenta OS, and SchilliX. The name and logo are references to the Celtic god of light, Belenus. BeleniX thus is also a first-class OpenSolaris development environment and is completely self-hosting. Every package included in BeleniX is built on BeleniX itself, including the OpenSolaris kernel. BeleniX aims to be an easy-to-use distribution that gently exposes the power of OpenSolaris. The Live CD format makes OpenSolaris more easily approachable, and boots within two to three minutes from a CD-ROM. It also aims to encourage innovation by bringing in new features and usability enhancements and increasing community participation.

== History ==
After the announcement of the OpenSolaris project, BeleniX was started as a private project by a few Sun employees working at Sun's India Engineering Centre in Bangalore, India, in the year 2005. Their aim was to have something along the lines of Knoppix to showcase OpenSolaris to end users. In a few weeks' time, an ISO image was ready for people to use.

BeleniX was developed further and grew in popularity. Non-Sun contributors joined in the effort developing it into a FOSS community project. BeleniX was the first OpenSolaris distribution to bundle a complete working X.Org X11 GUI environment.

Over the years a number of critical innovations sprung out of the BeleniX project which were later incorporated into the OpenSolaris distributions from Sun. In fact, the first beta release of Sun's OpenSolaris distribution was largely based on BeleniX. BeleniX was the second OpenSolaris distribution to appear, after SchilliX, and the first to provide an auto-configuring X.Org based GUI. It introduced various missing technologies in OpenSolaris. Some of the important innovations include:

- Auto-configuration of interfaces prior to NWAM (Network Auto-Magic)
- Complete working X.Org X11 environment, which later resulted in the Fully Open X project
- On-the-fly loopback decompression of CD contents
- New algorithm for file placement optimization leveraging DTrace profiling
- Implementation of read-ahead and I/O scheduling in the ISO 9660 filesystem in OpenSolaris
- Live CD built toolkit
- First OpenSolaris distribution to provide a NTFS and Ext2fs mount capability
- First OpenSolaris distribution to provide advanced X.Org auto-configuration capability
- First OpenSolaris distribution to be able to run a fully functional Java 5/6 environment
- First OpenSolaris distribution to provide a basic port of GNU Parted
- First OpenSolaris distribution to provide a complete KDE 3.5.x environment

Project Indiana has leveraged all these technologies and has served as a starting point for it. Taking this and other technologies developed for Indiana in account, the future focus for BeleniX has been set to evolve and grow as a source-level Indiana derivate with focus on the KDE desktop, and to make a fully featured and functional OpenSolaris distribution based on KDE.

Check the LiveCD Features Timeline in References to see a chronological account of BeleniX development till the release of the OpenSolaris distribution by Sun in 2008.

== Software and toolchain ==
The BeleniX team aimed to ensure that all packages co-exist on the same system, while ensuring that the latest versions of the package were built with the latest compilers. As a result, Belenix has had KDE 3.5.9 built with GCC 3.4.3, newer packages including KDE4 being increasingly built with GCC 4.4. There are some packages that are being built with Sun Studio 12, such as the GNOME components derived from the JDS project. These were being actively migrated to GCC 4.4. The team aimed to eventually have all of BeleniX built on GCC, which is a completely FOSS toolchain.

== Desktop environments ==
BeleniX has so far positioned itself as a KDE distribution, while also providing XFCE. Upcoming releases will also provide GNOME.

- KDE 3.x and 4.2.4(upcoming)
- XFCE
- GNOME

== Installation ==
BeleniX today uses the same Caiman Installer and libraries that are used in Sun's OpenSolaris distribution. Going forward there are plans to re-implement the Installer GUI in Qt4 while still using the underlying Caiman Installer libraries.

== Packaging ==
The BeleniX team presently continues to use SVR4 packaging, which is what Solaris has provided to date. The team does not intend to use IPS in its present state due to various technical reasons, and is considering alternatives including the deb format and the RPM5 format along with the Smart Package Manager.
