= ZFS+ =

ZFS+ is a combined file system and logical volume manager software subsystem initially released under the Common Development and Distribution License (CDDL). It is based on ZFS, originally developed by Sun Microsystems, with proprietary data deduplication features added by GreenBytes and subsequently made proprietary for a storage system product. GreenBytes originally owned the trademark on ZFS+, not to be confused with the ZFS trademark currently held by Oracle Corporation. (GreenBytes itself is now owned by Oracle.)

== Products ==
GreenBytes created a storage appliance, called Cypress NAS Filer, originally based upon the Sun Microsystems x86-64-based Sun Fire X4500 platform, and bundled their ZFS+ implementation as a value-add technology. GreenBytes claimed their ZFS+ technology could reduce storage power consumption by 50%.

In 2009, GreenBytes relaunched its technology under a new name, GBFS (GreenBytes File System).
