= Java Desktop Integration Components =

Pre-JDK desktop integration components project

The Java Desktop Integration Components (JDIC) project provides components which give Java applications the same access to operating system services as native applications. For example, a Java application running on one user's desktop can open a web page using that user's default web browser (e.g. Firefox), but the same Java application running on a different user's desktop would open the page in Opera (the second user's default browser). Initially the project supports features such as embedding the native HTML browser, programmatically opening the native mail client, using registered file-type viewers, and packaging JNLP applications as RPM, SVR4, and MSI installer packages. As a bonus, an SDK for developing platform-independent screensavers is included. Most of the features provided by JDIC were incorporated into the JDK starting with version 1.6. As a result, the development of the project has come to an end.

== Components ==
The cross-platform JDIC package, which files should allow the user to work, includes:

- jdic.jar: JAR file which contains all the Java classes needed for development. It must be in the classpath of the user for compilation.
- jdic.dll and tray.dll: On Windows installations, these files need to be into the directory where this operating system is installed (normally, C:\Windows). They contain the "bridge" methods between the jdic.jar Java methods and the native OS methods.
- libjdic.so and libtray.so: On Solaris and Linux operating systems, these two files must go into the LD_LIBRARY_PATH folder.

== See also ==
- Java Desktop
