= Nexenta OS =

Discontinued computer operating system

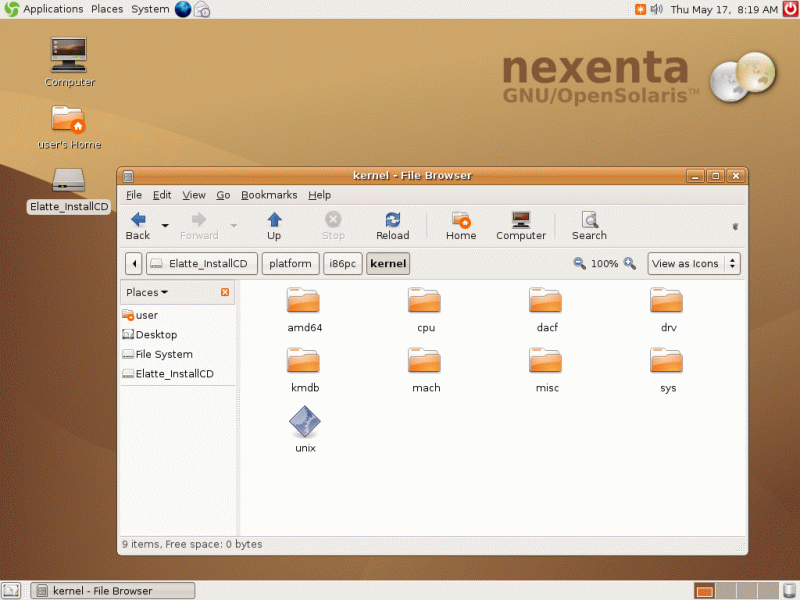
- Nexenta OS Alpha 5 running GNOME 2.14
- Developer: Nexenta Systems / HackZone members
- OS family: Unix-like (SVR4 and Linux)
- Working state: Discontinued
- Source model: Open source
- Final release: 3.1.3.5 (October 31, 2012; 13 years ago) [±]
- Final preview: 3.0 Release Candidate 3 (July 28, 2010; 16 years ago) [±]
- Update method: APT (front-ends available)
- Package manager: dpkg (front-ends like Synaptic available)
- Supported platforms: i386, AMD64, SPARC
- Kernel type: Monolithic (illumos)
- Userland: GNU, libc of OpenSolaris
- Default user interface: Command line/GNOME
- License: Various
- Official website: www.nexenta.com www.nexenta.org (archive)

Nexenta OS, officially known as the Nexenta Core Platform, is a discontinued computer operating system based on the OpenSolaris kernel and Ubuntu user space that runs on IA-32- and x86-64-based systems. It emerged in fall 2005, after Sun Microsystems started the OpenSolaris project in June of that year. Nexenta Systems, Inc. initiated the project and sponsored its development. Nexenta OS version 1.0 was released in February 2008.

In late 2011, the Nexenta OS brand was terminated and replaced with Illumian, which is derived from community development for illumos and OpenIndiana, but was distinguished by its use of Debian packaging. Illumian version 1.0 was released in February 2012. Following the initial release of Illumian in 2012, the Illumian project was discontinued.

== Repositories ==
There were initially two official APT repositories: "testing" and "unstable", totalling more than 9000 packages. A third "stable" was added for the first official release. Nexenta OS is available as InstallCD and VMware images. A Live CD is also available, but only for releases up to alpha 5.

Nexenta repositories follow the general Debian structure (main contrib non-free). Stable releases use a subset of this structure. Packages originate from Debian GNU/Linux. The nexenta.org website was retired in early 2012.

== Development ==
Since Nexenta OS does not use the Linux kernel, and Sun only recently began releasing the code of their Solaris operating system as free and open source software, it supports less diverse hardware than other Debian variants.

The Nexenta OS team decided to focus on a minimal OpenSolaris effort called the Nexenta Core Platform (NCP) which forms the basis of the NexentaStor NAS storage solution. Version 1.0 of Nexenta Core Platform was released on February 10, 2008.

Nexenta Core Platform was the first operating system to combine the OpenSolaris kernel with GNU userland tools. It aimed to bring technologies such as ZFS and Zones to the GNU/Debian community. An additional purpose of the OS was to provide a kernel allowing proprietary closed source hardware drivers to be produced for inclusion in an open source operating system.

== Releases and History ==
- Nexenta Core Platform 1.0 was released on February 10, 2008. It was based on Ubuntu 6.06 "Dapper Drake" and OpenSolaris b82. The release included:
  - ZFS root/boot
  - Zones integrated with dpkg/apt-get
  - BrandZ with preconfigured support for Debian and Ubuntu
  - Stable toolchain
  - Server/storage software support
  - Xen DomU/Dom0
- Nexenta Core Platform 2.0 was released on May 25, 2009. It included packages based on Ubuntu 8.04 "Hardy Heron" LTS.
- Nexenta Core Platform 3.0.1 was released on September 17, 2010. The release included many updated packages, support for ZFS deduplication, and Crossbow support, among other fixes.
- Nexenta Core Platform was terminated and replaced by Illumian in late 2011.

== NexentaStor ==
NexentaStor is a proprietary operating system built by Nexenta Systems on top of the Nexenta Core Platform. It is optimized for use in virtualized server environments including NAS, iSCSI, and Fibre Channel applications, and is built around the ZFS file system. It features iSCSI support, unlimited incremental backups or 'snapshots', snapshot mirroring (replication), block level mirroring (CDP), integrated search within ZFS snapshots and a custom API. Through its focus on ZFS, it carries with it potential benefits for virtualized server farms in terms of performance and thin provisioning. The operating system is currently distributed as ISO and VMware disk images with pricing determined on a per-terabyte and per-server licensing basis.

A "community edition" was available free of charge for users with less than 18 terabytes of raw disk space (pre-redundancy and volume creation). This free tier model changed with the release of version 5.0 (community edition only) to a 10 terabyte limit of assigned and usable (post-redundancy and volume creation) disk space. It is the same as the enterprise version, except for the lack of paid plugins and commercial support. It can install many of the free and open source plugins that are developed and hosted on the community edition website. The "community edition" though is only intended for hobbyist use. Production use of the "community edition" is forbidden by the NexentaStor EULA. Therefore, the use of the term "community edition" remains very disputable.

== ReadyDATAOS ==
The ReadyDATAOS firmware is an embedded network-attached storage (NAS) distribution based on Nexenta OS and has the same ZFS support as Nexenta OS. It runs on NetGear ReadyDATA hardware.

== See also ==
- GNU variants
