= Nexenta Systems =

Software company

Nexenta Systems, Inc.
- Type: Private
- Industry: Computer data storage Computer software
- Founded: 2005
- Founder: Alex Aizman; Dmitry Yusupov
- Headquarters: San Jose, California, United States
- Key people: Tarkan Maner(CEO); Dmitry Yusupov (CTO); Phil Underwood (COO)
- Products: NexentaStor; NexentaCloud; NexentaEdge; NexentaFusion
- Website: nexenta.com

Nexenta by DDN, Inc., is a subsidiary of DataDirect Networks that sells computer data storage and backup software. It is headquartered in San Jose, California. Nexenta developed NexentaStor, NexentaCloud, NexentaFusion, and NexentaEdge. It was founded as Nexenta Systems, Inc., in 2005.

== History ==
=== Origins and acquisition ===
In 2005, Nexenta was founded by Alex Aizman and Dmitry Yusupov, software developers and former executives at computer network vendor Silverback (later acquired by Brocade Communications Systems). Aizman and Yusupov previously worked together as the authors of the open source iSCSI initiator software in the Linux kernel.

The company was created to support the open source Nexenta OS project after Sun Microsystems released the bulk of its Solaris operating system under free software licenses as OpenSolaris. Nexenta OS was an operating system that integrated Sun's Solaris kernel and core technologies with applications from the Debian and Ubuntu operating systems.

Nexenta was acquired by DataDirect Networks in May 2019.

=== Data storage ===
The company's data storage software was used at Stanford University in 2012 and 2013. The field had previously been dominated by companies that sold hardware storage appliances. Nexenta intended to compete by creating a storage system that did not require specialized hardware. The company instead provides software that run on lower-cost commodity computing hardware, a model later called software-defined storage.

=== Partnerships and open source ===
Much of Nexenta's business comes from partners that provide hardware and services alongside Nexenta software. The company's software is pre-installed on storage systems from vendors including Supermicro, Cisco, and Dell.

Nexenta continues to contribute to free and open-source software used in its products. When Oracle Corporation discontinued OpenSolaris in 2010, the company became a founding member of the Illumos open source project that replaced it.

== Products ==
Nexenta's product NexentaStor is software for network-attached storage (NAS) and storage area network (SAN) services. NexentaStor was derived from Nexenta OS, based on the Illumos operating system. The software runs on commodity hardware and creates storage virtualization pools consisting of multiple hard disk drives and solid-state drives. Data can be organized in a number of file systems and blocks, and files can be accessed over the Network File System (NFS) and CIFS protocols, while block storage uses iSCSI or Fibre Channel protocols. NexentaStor allows online snapshots of data to be taken and replicated to other systems. Nexenta uses RSF-1 cluster to build a high availability storage.
