= GreenBytes =

American IT company

- Type: Private
- Industry: Computer Software, IT Services
- Founded: Ashaway, Rhode Island, United States (2007)
- Founder: Robert Petrocelli; Richard Petrocelli
- Defunct: May 15, 2014
- Fate: Acquired by Oracle Corporation
- Headquarters: 275 Promenade Street, Suite 225, Providence, Rhode Island, United States
- Area served: Worldwide
- Key people: Robert Petrocelli (Founder & CEO); Lisa Waldman (Senior Vice President, Global Sales); Kevin Brown (Chief Financial Officer); Michael Robinson (Vice President, Marketing); John Poduska (Vice President, Software Engineering); Richard Petrocelli (Director & Chief Legal Counsel)
- Products: IO Offload Engine
- Website: oracle.com/greenbytes

GreenBytes was an American company providing inline deduplication data storage appliances and cloud-scale IO-Offload systems. Robert Petrocelli founded the company in 2007. On May 15, 2014, it was acquired by Oracle Corporation.

== History ==
The company began as a provider of energy-efficient inline deduplication storage appliances.

In March 2012, GreenBytes released Solidarity, a high availability solid-state drive (SSD) array. Solidarity’s operating system, GO OS, provides real-time deduplication and compression.

In 2012, the company raised $12 million from Generation Investment Management, an investment fund founded by former US Vice President Al Gore, bringing the total amount it had raised by then to $24 million. GreenBytes stated it would use the new funds to expand sales and marketing of its data storage arrays.

In July 2012, GreenBytes acquired the ZEVO ZFS technology for Mac OS X, developed by former Apple engineer Don Brady, who then joined the GreenBytes team. In that same month, Stephen O’Donnell became chairman of the company and Brett Johnson was appointed as senior vice president of global sales.

In August 2012, the company announced a new virtual desktop infrastructure device called IO Offload Engine. The IO Offload Engine captures the I/O intense data stream and processes it in a more effective and efficient manner. This represented a shift for GreenBytes from a focus as a storage array vendor toward input/output–offload solutions for the virtual desktop.

On May 15, 2014, the company was acquired by Oracle Corporation.
