= Image Packaging System =

Cross-platform package management system

The Image Packaging System, also known as IPS, is a cross-platform package management system created by the OpenSolaris community in coordination with Sun Microsystems. It is used by Solaris 11 and several Illumos-based distributions: OpenIndiana, OmniOS, XStreamOS and a growing number of layered applications, including GlassFish, across a variety of operating system platforms. IPS is currently written in the Python programming language, but a rust implementation intended to succeed it is in progress.

== Features ==
IPS enables a superuser to search for, install, and remove software packages from the Solaris system.

- Use of ZFS, allowing multiple boot environments and easy package operation rollbacks
- Transactional actions
- Support for multiple platform architectures within a single package
- Legacy support for SVR4 packages
- Extensive search grammar
- Remote search capability
- Changes-only based package updates
- Network package repository
- File and network-based package publication
- Package operation history
- On-disk package format (p5p)
- Multi-platform ports for layered applications:
  - Broad platform support: Windows, Linux, OS X, Darwin, Solaris, OpenSolaris, Illumos and AIX
  - Cross-platform update notification and package management Graphical user interfaces.

== Considerations ==
Due to the fact that IPS delivers each file in a separate shelf with a separate checksum, a package update only needs to replace files that have been modified. When dealing with ELF binaries, IPS computes checksums only from the loaded parts of an ELF binary. This means in practice that when only the ELF comment section has been changed, there would be no need to update it. However, this method of delivery can cause slower operation when the input source is on a medium with high latency (e.g. internet with higher round trip time or CD/DVD media with slow seeks).
