= Richard Green (technologist) =

American software engineer and business executive

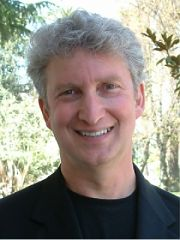
- Richard Green
- Born: Brooklyn, New York
- Occupations: software engineer and business executive

Richard Green is an American business executive. Green was born in Brooklyn, New York. He holds Bachelors and master's degrees with a specialization in Geographic Information Systems (GIS) and spatial analytics.

He joined Sun Microsystems in 1989 serving as Executive Vice President of Software and as VP/GM of Solaris and Java. He left Sun in 2004.

Green served as CTO of Nokia Corporation and as Executive Vice President of the Mobile and Enterprise business unit at Nuance Communications. As of 2016, Green was the EVP/Chief Product Officer and CTO for SugarCRM.
