= NexentaStor =

- Developer: Nexenta Systems
- Written in: C
- OS family: Unix-like
- Working state: Current
- Latest release: 5.5.0-FP2 / 6 July 2023; 3 years ago
- Available in: English
- Kernel type: Monolithic
- Userland: illumos
- License: Proprietary
- Preceded by: Nexenta OS
- Official website: nexenta.com/products/nexentastor

NexentaStor is an OpenSolaris or more recently Illumos distribution optimized for virtualization, storage area networks, network-attached storage, and iSCSI or Fibre Channel applications employing the ZFS file system.

Like OpenSolaris, NexentaStor is a Unix-like operating system. Nexenta Systems started NexentaStor as a fork of another OpenSolaris distribution, Illumos.

NexentaStor supports iSCSI, unlimited incremental backups ('snapshots'), snapshot mirroring (replication), continuous data protection, integrated search within ZFS snapshots, and an API.

Nexenta distributes the operating system as a disk image. The Community Edition is available free of charge for users with up 10 TB of used disk space who deploy the operating system in a non-production environment.

NexentaStor Community Edition includes all the common storage area network features of the production version, but if the amount of disk data addressed by the system exceeds 18 TB, the operating system locks most administration functions.
