= Java Desktop System =

Desktop environment

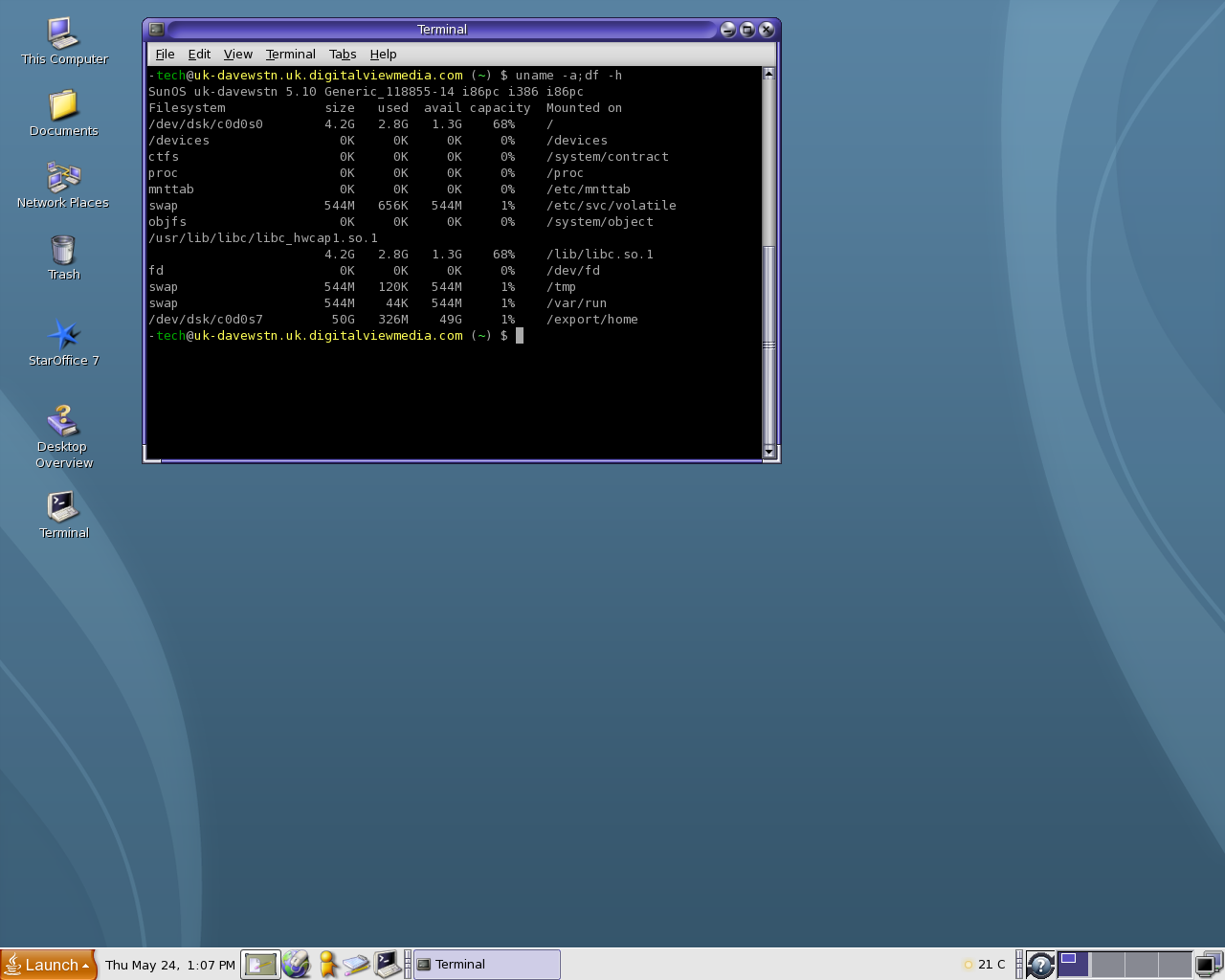
- Solaris 10 with Java Desktop System Release 3
- Developer: Oracle Corporation
- Stable release: 3
- Operating system: Solaris
- Type: Desktop environment
- License: LGPL; GPL
- Website: sun.com/software at the Wayback Machine (archived 2005-03-06)

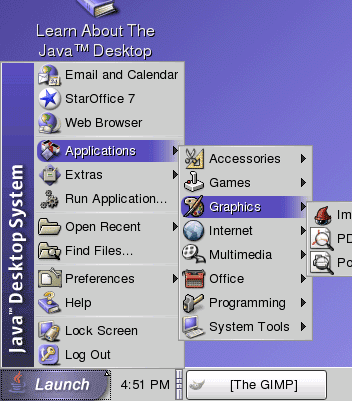
Java Desktop System

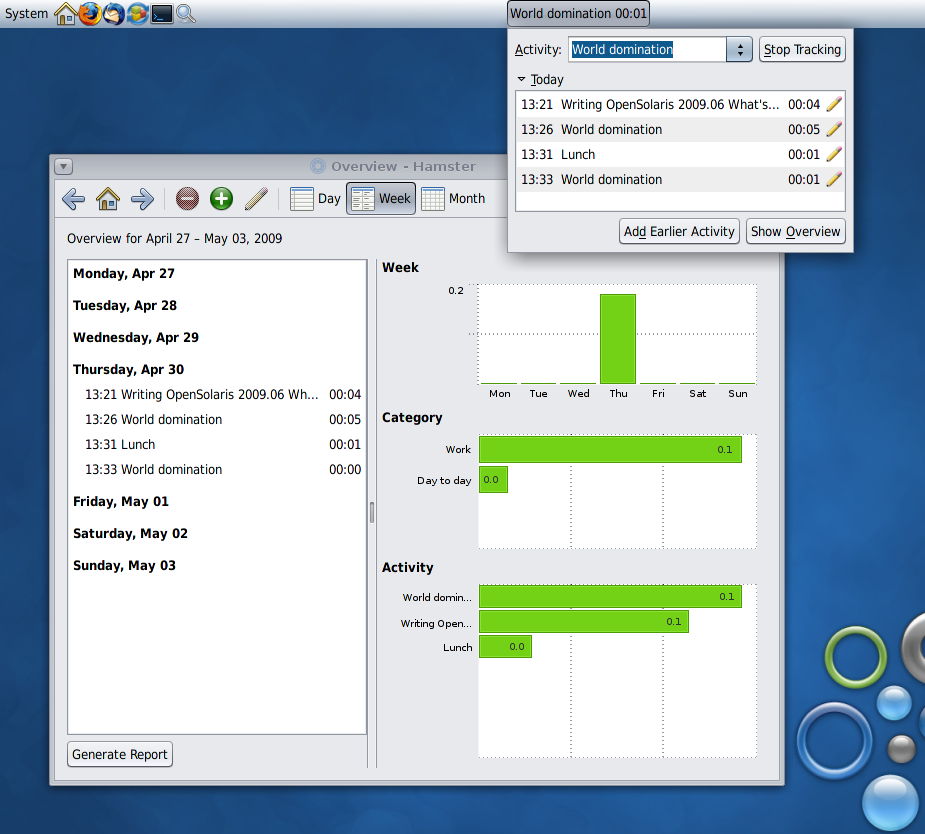
OpenSolaris 2009.6 Desktop (discontinued)

Java Desktop System, briefly known as OpenSolaris Desktop, is a legacy desktop environment developed first by Sun Microsystems and then by Oracle Corporation after the 2010 Oracle acquisition of Sun. Java Desktop System is available for Solaris and was once available for Linux. The Linux version was discontinued after Solaris was released as open source software in 2005. Java Desktop System aims to provide a system familiar to the average computer user with a full suite of office productivity software such as an office suite, a web browser, email, calendaring, and instant messaging.

Despite being known as the Java Desktop System, it is not actually written in Java. Rather, it is built around a modified version of GNOME along with other common free software projects, which are written mostly in C and C++. The name reflected Sun's promotion of the product as an outlet for corporate users to deploy software written for the Java platform.

== Versions ==
JDS was originally made available via a titular "operating environment", which was a custom Linux distribution based upon SUSE Linux.

Sun first bundled a preview release of GNOME 1.4 on a separate CD for Solaris 8.

JDS version 2 included:

- Java
- GNOME (using the Blueprint theme)
- StarOffice
- Mozilla
- Evolution
- MP3 and CD player
- Java Media Framework's Java Media Player
- Gaim multi-service instant messaging
- RealPlayer

JDS Release 2 was available for Solaris and for the SuSE-based Linux distribution.

JDS Release 3 was released in 2005. It was included with Solaris 10 — upon installation of Solaris, one has the choice of using either the CDE or JDS. It was based on GNOME 2.6 and available only for the Solaris 10 platform.

== OpenSolaris Desktop ==
OpenSolaris received its own version of the Java Desktop System. OpenSolaris Desktop was tied to the OpenSolaris operating system, and did not have its own release schedule.

OpenSolaris Desktop 01 (released October 28, 2005) was based on GNOME 2.10 and OpenSolaris Desktop 02 (released December 23, 2005) was based on GNOME 2.12. The last version was released with the release of OpenSolaris 2009.6, and was based on Gnome 2.24. It also included Firefox 3.1, OpenOffice 3 and Sun VirtualBox. The OpenSolaris Desktop line of the Java Desktop System became defunct with the end of the OpenSolaris project.

== Availability ==
With the end of the OpenSolaris project, JDS Release 3 is now the last release of the project on a currently supported operating system Solaris 10. Newer Solaris based operating systems have abandoned the Java Desktop System. Solaris 11 and projects based upon the OpenSolaris codebase such as OpenIndiana use a stock version of GNOME.

== See also ==
- Project Looking Glass
