= Oracle ZFS =

Proprietary file system and logical volume manager by Oracle

- Initial release: November 2005; 20 years ago, part of OpenSolaris
- Stable release: 11.4 SRU53 (Solaris OS) / January 18, 2023; 3 years ago
- Written in: C
- Operating system: Oracle Solaris
- License: Proprietary
- Website: docs.oracle.com/cd/E23824_01/html/821-1448/zfsover-1.html

Oracle ZFS is Oracle's proprietary implementation of the ZFS file system and logical volume manager for Oracle Solaris. ZFS is a registered trademark belonging to Oracle.

== History ==
=== Solaris 10 ===
In update 2 and later, ZFS is part of Sun's own Solaris 10 operating system and is thus available on both SPARC and x86-based systems.

=== Solaris 11 ===
After Oracle's Solaris 11 Express release, the OS/Net consolidation (the main OS code) was made proprietary and closed-source, and further ZFS upgrades and implementations inside Solaris (such as encryption) are not compatible with other non-proprietary implementations which use previous versions of ZFS.

When creating a new ZFS pool, to retain the ability to use access the pool from other non-proprietary Solaris-based distributions, it is recommended to upgrade to Solaris 11 Express from OpenSolaris (snv_134b), and thereby stay at ZFS version 28.

=== Future development ===
On September 2, 2017, Simon Phipps reported that Oracle had laid off virtually all of its Solaris core development staff, interpreting it as a sign that Oracle no longer intends to support future development of the platform.

== Version history ==
Legend:
Old release
Latest Proprietary stable release

ZFS Filesystem Version Number	OS Release	Significant changes
6	Solaris 11.1	Multilevel file system support
7	Solaris 11.4 SRU 45	File retention support
8	Solaris 11.4 SRU 51	Unicode versioning support

ZFS Pool Version Number	OS Release	Significant changes
29	Solaris Nevada b148	RAID-Z/mirror hybrid allocator
30	Solaris Nevada b149	ZFS encryption
31	Solaris Nevada b150	Improved 'zfs list' performance
32	Solaris Nevada b151	One MB block support
33	Solaris Nevada b163	Improved share support
34	Solaris 11.1 (0.5.11-0.175.1.0.0.24.2)	Sharing with inheritance
35	Solaris 11.2 (0.5.11-0.175.2.0.0.42.0)	Sequential resilver
36	Solaris 11.3	Efficient log block allocation
37	Solaris 11.3	LZ4 compression
38	Solaris 11.4	xcopy with encryption
39	Solaris 11.4	reduce resilver restart
40	Solaris 11.4	Deduplication 2
41	Solaris 11.4	Asynchronous dataset destroy
42	Solaris 11.4	Reguid: ability to change the pool guid
43	Solaris 11.4, Oracle ZFS Storage Simulator 8.7	RAID-Z improvements and cloud device support.
44	Solaris 11.4	Device removal
45	Solaris 11.4 SRU 11	Lazy deadlists
46	Solaris 11.4 SRU 12	Compact file metadata for encryption
47	Solaris 11.4 SRU 21	Property Support for ZVOLs
48	Solaris 11.4 SRU 45	File retention support
49	Solaris 11.4 SRU 51	Unicode versioning support
50	Solaris 11.4 SRU 57	Raw crypto replication
51	Solaris 11.4 SRU 63	'onexpiry' options for file retention
52	Solaris 11.4 SRU 72	Mount support for 'clonedir'
53	Solaris 11.4 SRU 78	Maximize space
54	Solaris 11.4 SRU 90	Allow scrub/resilver to run during snapshot cleanup
