= OpenSolaris =

Open source operating system from Sun Microsystems based on Solaris

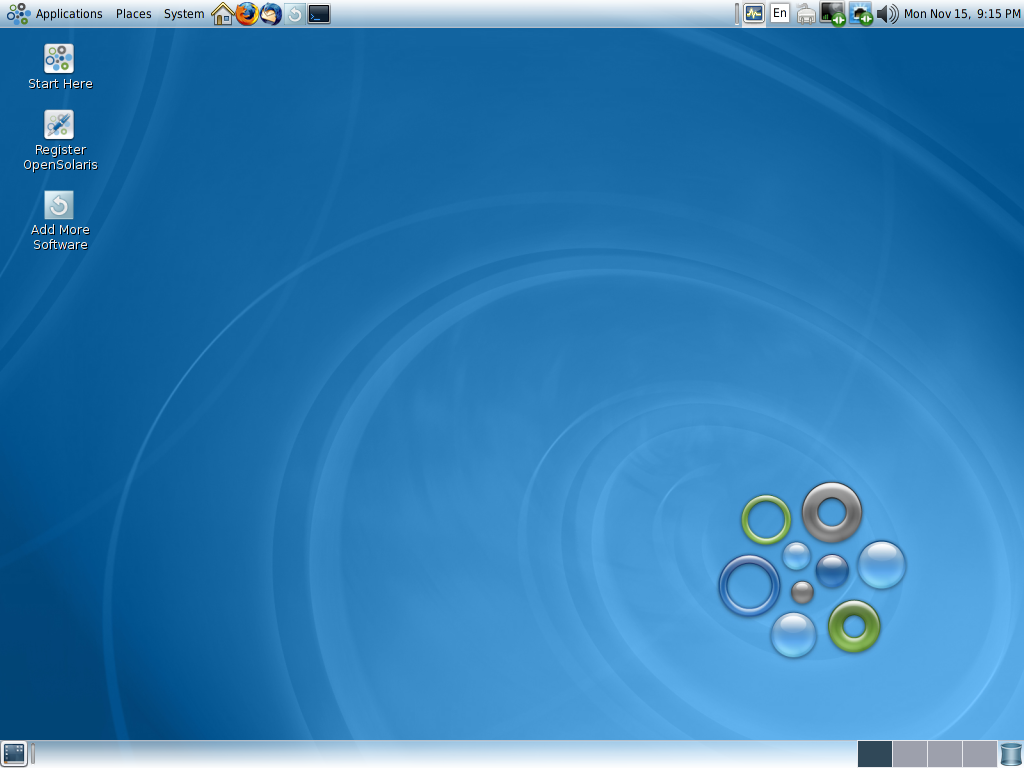
- OpenSolaris build snv_134b
- Developer: Sun Microsystems
- Written in: C
- OS family: Unix (System V Release 4)
- Working state: Discontinued, continued by illumos
- Source model: Open source
- Initial release: May 5, 2008; 18 years ago
- Latest release: 2009.06 / June 1, 2009; 17 years ago
- Latest preview: snv_134 (build 134) x86/SPARC / March 8, 2010; 16 years ago
- Available in: Multilingual (more than 53)
- Update method: Image Packaging System
- Package manager: Package Manager, pkg
- Supported platforms: SPARC, IA-32, x86-64
- Kernel type: Monolithic
- Userland: SVR4 C library, GNU Core Utilities and traditional Solaris commands
- Default user interface: GNOME
- License: Mostly CDDL with proprietary components and other licenses
- Official website: opensolaris.org at the Wayback Machine (archived 2008-06-05)

OpenSolaris (/ˌoʊpən səˈlɑːrɪs/ (Note: The pronunciation rhymes with "Polaris". Lexico UK English Dictionary. Oxford University Press. Archived from the original on 2020-08-06.)) is a discontinued open-source computer operating system for SPARC and x86 based systems, created by Sun Microsystems and based on Solaris. Its development began in the mid 2000s and ended in 2010.

OpenSolaris was developed as a combination of several software consolidations that were open sourced starting with Solaris 10. It includes a variety of free software, including popular desktop and server software. It is a descendant of the UNIX System V Release 4 (SVR4) code base developed by Sun and AT&T in the late 1980s and is the only version of the System V variant of UNIX available as open source.

After Oracle's acquisition of Sun Microsystems in 2010, Oracle discontinued development of OpenSolaris in house, pivoting to focus exclusively on the development of the proprietary Solaris Express (now Oracle Solaris). Prior to Oracle's close-sourcing Solaris, a group of former OpenSolaris developers began efforts to fork the core software under the name OpenIndiana, and the illumos Foundation that was created at the time continues to develop and maintain the kernel and userland of OpenIndiana, and since then additional illumos distributions, both commercial and non-commercial, have appeared and are under active development.

== History ==
OpenSolaris was based on Solaris, which was originally released by Sun in 1991. Solaris is a version of UNIX System V Release 4 (SVR4), jointly developed by Sun and AT&T to merge features from several existing Unix systems. It was licensed by Sun from Novell to replace SunOS.

Planning for OpenSolaris started in early 2004. A pilot program was formed in September 2004 with 18 non-Sun community members and ran for 9 months growing to 145 external participants. Sun submitted the CDDL (Common Development and Distribution License) to the OSI, which approved it on January 14, 2005.

The first part of the Solaris code base to be open-sourced was the Solaris Dynamic Tracing facility (commonly known as DTrace), a tool that aids in the analysis, debugging, and tuning of applications and systems. DTrace was released under the CDDL on January 25, 2005, on the newly launched opensolaris.org website. The bulk of the Solaris system code was released on June 14, 2005. There remains some system code that is not open source and is available only as pre-compiled binary files.

To direct the newly fledged project, a Community Advisory Board was announced on April 4, 2005: two were elected by the pilot community, two were employees appointed by Sun, and one was appointed from the broader free software community by Sun. The members were Roy Fielding, Al Hopper, Rich Teer, Casper Dik, and Simon Phipps. On February 10, 2006, Sun approved The OpenSolaris Charter, which reestablished this body as the independent OpenSolaris Governing Board. The task of creating a governance document or "constitution" for this organization was given to the OGB and three invited members: Stephen Hahn and Keith Wesolowski (developers in Sun's Solaris organization) and Ben Rockwood (a prominent OpenSolaris community member). The former next-generation Solaris OS version under development by Sun to eventually succeed Solaris 10 was codenamed 'Nevada', and was derived from what was the OpenSolaris codebase and this new code was then pulled into new OpenSolaris 'Nevada' snapshot builds. "While under Sun Microsystems' control, there were bi-weekly snapshots of Solaris Nevada (the codename for the next-generation Solaris OS to eventually succeed Solaris 10), and this new code was then pulled into new OpenSolaris preview snapshots available at Genunix.org. The stable releases of OpenSolaris are based on these Nevada builds."

Initially, Sun's Solaris Express program provided a distribution based on the OpenSolaris code in combination with software found only in Solaris releases. The first independent distribution was released on June 17, 2005, and many others have emerged since.

On March 19, 2007, Sun announced that it had hired Ian Murdock, founder of Debian, to head Project Indiana, an effort to produce a complete OpenSolaris distribution, with GNOME and userland tools from GNU, plus a network-based package management system. The new distribution was planned to refresh the user experience and would become the successor to Solaris Express as the basis for future releases of Solaris.

On May 5, 2008, OpenSolaris 2008.05 was released in a format that could be booted as a Live CD or installed directly. It uses the GNOME desktop environment as the primary user interface. The later OpenSolaris 2008.11 release included a GUI for ZFS' snapshotting capabilities, known as Time Slider, that provides functionality similar to macOS's Time Machine.

In December 2008, Sun Microsystems and Toshiba America Information Systems announced plans to distribute Toshiba laptops pre-installed with OpenSolaris. On April 1, 2009, the Tecra M10 and Portégé R600 came preinstalled with OpenSolaris 2008.11 release and several supplemental software packages.

On June 1, 2009, OpenSolaris 2009.06 was released, with support for the SPARC platform.

On January 6, 2010, it was announced that the Solaris Express program would be closed while an OpenSolaris binary release was scheduled to be released on March 26, 2010. The OpenSolaris 2010.03 release never appeared.

On August 13, 2010, Oracle was rumored to have discontinued the OpenSolaris binary distribution to focus on the Solaris Express binary distribution program. Source code would continue to be accepted from the community and Oracle source code would continue to be released into Open Source, but Oracle code releases would occur only after binary releases. The internal email was released by an OpenSolaris kernel developer but was unconfirmed by Oracle.

There was a post confirming the leak posted to the OpenSolaris Forums on August 13, 2010. Upstream contributions will continue through a new Oracle website, downstream source code publishing will continue, and binary distribution will continue under the old Solaris Express model, the but release of source code will occur after binary cuts, and binary cuts will become less frequent.

On September 14, 2010, OpenIndiana was formally launched at the JISC Centre in London. While OpenIndiana is a fork in the technical sense, it is a continuation of OpenSolaris in spirit: the project intends to deliver a System V family operating system that is binary-compatible with the Oracle products Solaris 11 and Solaris 11 Express. However, rather than being based around the OS/Net consolidation like OpenSolaris was, OpenIndiana became a distribution based on illumos (the first release is still based around OS/Net). The project uses the same IPS package management system as OpenSolaris.

On November 12, 2010, a final build of OpenSolaris (134b) was published by Oracle to the /release repository to serve as an upgrade path to Solaris 11 Express.

Oracle Solaris 11 Express 2010.11, a preview of Solaris 11 and the first release of the post-OpenSolaris distribution from Oracle, was released on November 15, 2010.

== Version history ==
Legend: Release no longer supported

Version	Build	Release date	End of support phase		
Version	Build	Release date	General Availability (GA)	Post End of Version (EOV)	SunSpectrum End of Service Life (SS-EOSL)
2008.05	86	13 May 2008	13 November 2008	13 May 2011	-
2008.11	101b	25 November 2008	25 May 2009	25 November 2011	-
2009.06	111b	1 June 2009	1 December 2009	1 June 2012	1 June 2014

== Release model ==
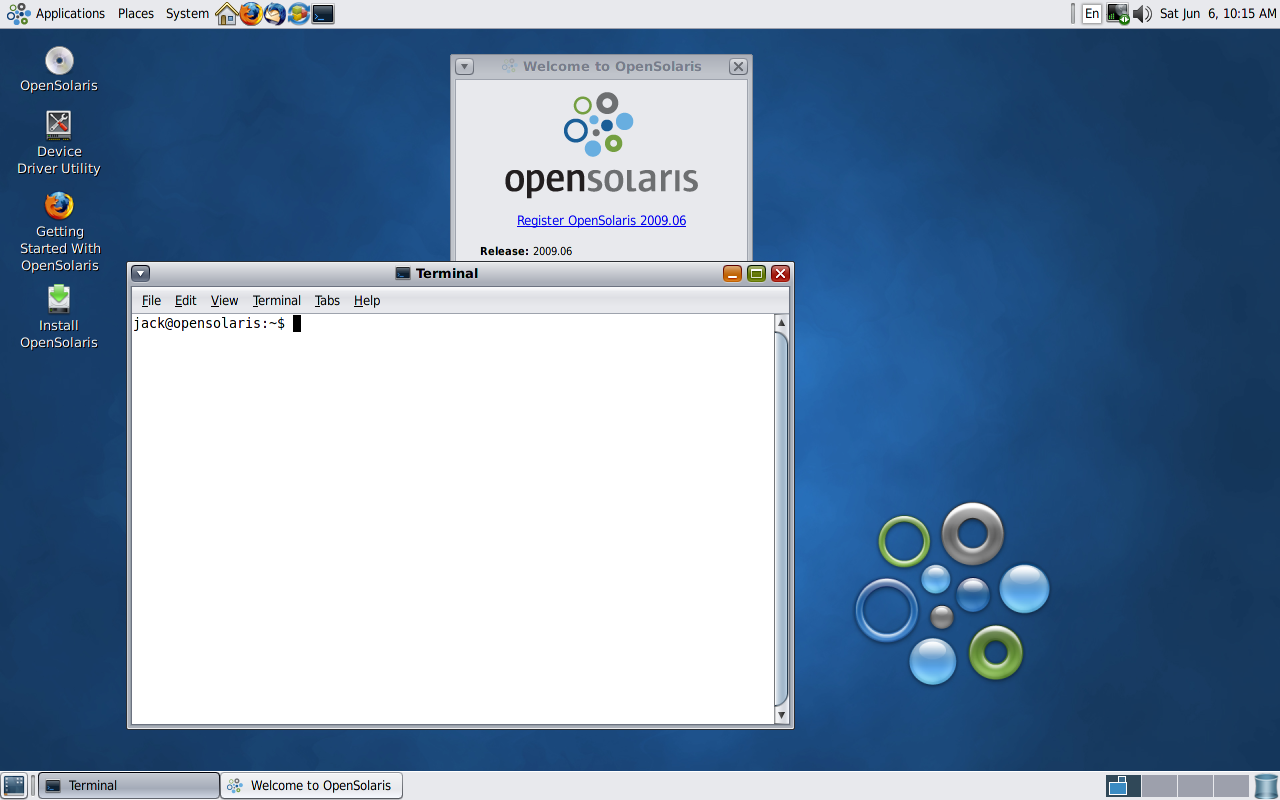
OpenSolaris 2009.06 x86 LiveCD GNOME with terminal

OpenSolaris was offered as both development (unstable) and production (stable) releases.

- Development releases were built from the latest OpenSolaris codebase (consolidations) and included newer technologies, security updates and bug fixes, and more applications, but may not have undergone extensive testing.
- Production releases were branched from a snapshot of the development codebase (following a code freeze) and underwent a QA process that includes backporting security updates and bug fixes.

OpenSolaris can be installed from CD-ROM, USB drives, or over a network with the Automated Installer. CD, USB, and network install images are made available for both types of releases.

=== Repositories ===
OpenSolaris uses a network-aware package management system called the Image Packaging System (also known as pkg(5)) to add, remove, and manage installed software and to update to newer releases.

Packages for development releases of OpenSolaris were published by Oracle typically every two weeks to the /dev repository. Production releases use the /release repository which does not receive updates until the next production release. Only Sun customers with paid support contracts have access to updates for production releases.

Paid support for production releases which allows access to security updates and bug fixes was offered by Sun through the /support repository on pkg.sun.com.

== Documentation ==
A hardware compatibility list (HCL) for OpenSolaris can be consulted when choosing hardware for OpenSolaris deployment.

Extensive OpenSolaris administration, usage, and development documentation is available online, including community-contributed information.

== License ==
Sun released most of the Solaris source code under the Common Development and Distribution License (CDDL), which is based on the Mozilla Public License (MPL) version 1.1. The CDDL was approved as an open source license by the Open Source Initiative (OSI) in January 2005. Files licensed under the CDDL can be combined with files licensed under other licenses, whether open source or proprietary.

During Sun's announcement of Java's release under the GNU General Public License (GPL), Jonathan Schwartz and Rich Green both hinted at the possibility of releasing Solaris under the GPL, with Green saying he was "certainly not" averse to relicensing under the GPL. When Schwartz pressed him (jokingly), Green said Sun would "take a very close look at it." In January 2007, eWeek reported that anonymous sources at Sun had told them OpenSolaris would be dual-licensed under CDDL and GPLv3. Green responded in his blog the next day that the article was incorrect, saying that although Sun is giving "very serious consideration" to such a dual-licensing arrangement, it would be subject to agreement by the rest of the OpenSolaris community.

== Conferences ==
The first annual OpenSolaris Developer Conference (abbreviated as OSDevCon) was organized by the German Unix User Group (GUUG) and took place from February 27 to March 2, 2007, at the Freie Universität Berlin in Germany. The 2008 OSDevCon was a joint effort of the GUUG and the Czech OpenSolaris User Group (CZOSUG) and look place June 25–27, 2008, in Prague, Czech Republic. The 2009 OSDevCon look place October 27–30, 2009, in Dresden, Germany.

In 2007, Sun Microsystems organized the first OpenSolaris Developer Summit, which was held on the weekend of October 13, 2007, at the University of California, Santa Cruz in the United States. The 2008 OpenSolaris Developer Summit returned to UCSC on May 2–3, 2008, and took place immediately prior to the launch of Sun's new OpenSolaris distribution on May 5, 2008, at the CommunityOne conference in San Francisco, California.

The first OpenSolaris Storage Summit was organized by Sun and held September 21, 2008, preceding the SNIA Storage Developer Conference (SDC), in Santa Clara, California. The second OpenSolaris Storage Summit preceded the USENIX Conference on File and Storage Technologies (FAST) on February 23, 2009, in San Francisco, United States.

On November 3, 2009, a Solaris/OpenSolaris Security Summit was held by Sun in the Inner Harbor area of Baltimore, Maryland, preceding the Large Installation System Administration Conference (LISA).

== Ports ==
- PowerPC Port: Project Polaris, experimental PowerPC port, based on the previous porting effort, Project Pulsar from Sun Labs.
- OpenSolaris for System z, for IBM mainframes: Project Sirius, developed by Sine Nomine Associates, named as an analogy to Polaris.
- OpenSolaris on ARM Port
- OpenSolaris on MIPS Port

== Derivatives ==
Notable derivatives include:

- illumos, a fully open source fork of the project, started in 2010 by a community of Sun OpenSolaris engineers and the NexentaOS support. Note that OpenSolaris was not 100% open source: Some drivers and some libraries were property of other companies that Sun (now Oracle) licensed and was not able to release.
- OpenIndiana, a project under the illumos umbrella aiming "... to become the defacto OpenSolaris distribution installed on production servers where security and bug fixes are required free of charge."
- NexentaStor, optimized for storage workloads, based on Nexenta OS
- OSDyson: illumos kernel with GNU userland and packages from Debian. Strives to become an official Debian port.
- SmartOS: Virtualization-centered derivative from Joyent.

=== Discontinued ===
- Nexenta OS (discontinued October 31, 2012), first distribution based on Ubuntu userland with Solaris-derived kernel

== See also ==
- Comparison of OpenSolaris distributions
- Comparison of open source operating systems
- Image Packaging System
- OpenSolaris Network Virtualization and Resource Control
- Darwin (operating system)
