= OpenIndiana =

Solaris-like operating system based on illumos

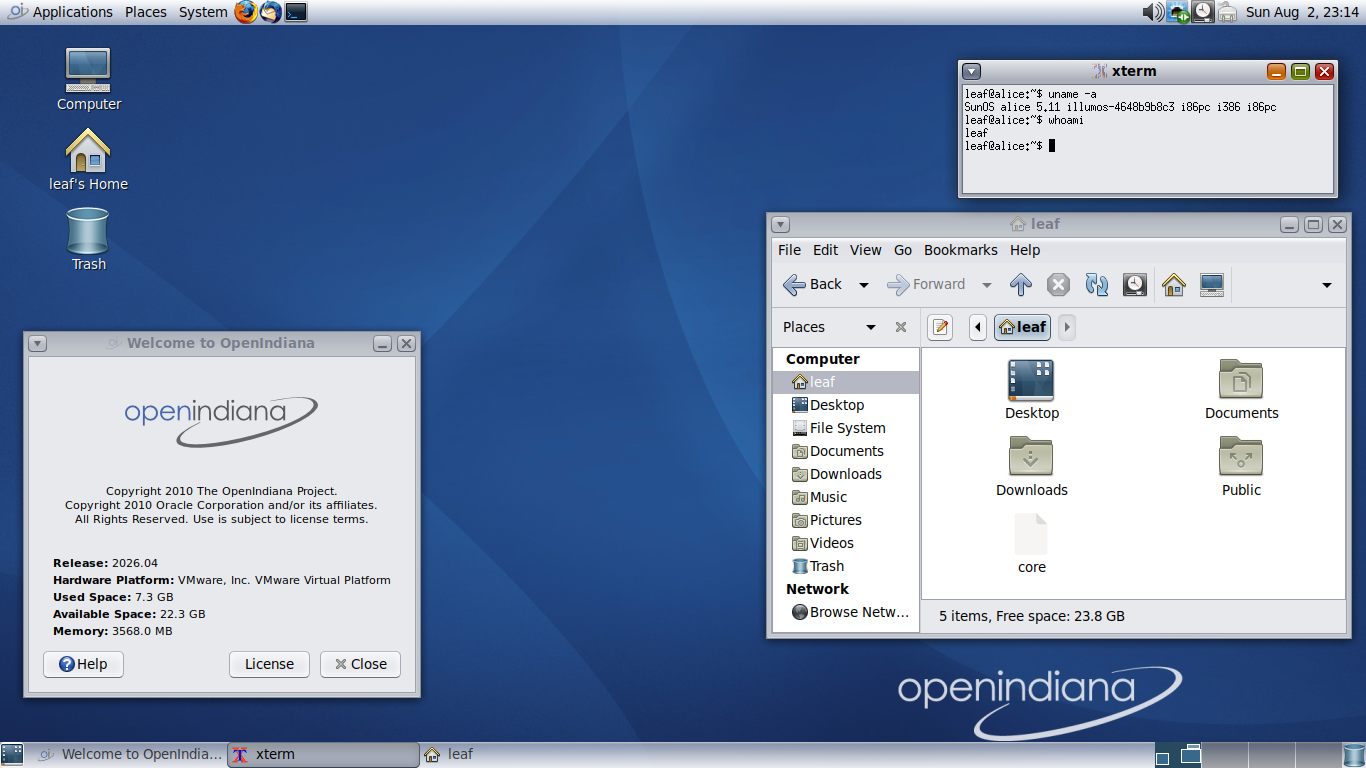
- OpenIndiana Hipster 2026.04
- Developer: Illumos Foundation (kernel); OpenIndiana Project (userland)
- Written in: C
- OS family: Unix (System V Release 4)
- Working state: Current
- Source model: Open source
- Latest release: Hipster 2026.10 (November 7, 2026; 13 days ago) [±]
- Repository: github.com/OpenIndiana
- Available in: Multilingual
- Update method: Image Packaging System
- Package manager: pkg (IPS)
- Supported platforms: x86-64, SPARC
- Kernel type: Monolithic
- Userland: illumos and GNU Core Utilities
- Default user interface: oi_147 - 2016.04: GNOME 2; since 2016.10: MATE
- License: CDDL and others
- Official website: openindiana.org

OpenIndiana (stylized as openindiana) is a free and open-source illumos distribution compatible with SPARC and x86-64 based computers. The project began in 2010, forked from OpenSolaris after OpenSolaris was discontinued by Oracle Corporation, and is hence descended from UNIX System V Release 4.

Created by a development team led by Alasdair Lumsden, the OpenIndiana project is now stewarded by the illumos Foundation, which develops and maintains the illumos operating system. The project aims to make OpenIndiana "the de facto OpenSolaris distribution installed on production servers where security and bug fixes are provided free of charge."

== History ==
OpenIndiana takes its name from Project Indiana, the internal codename for OpenSolaris at Sun Microsystems before Oracle's acquisition of Sun in 2010.

=== Origins ===
Project Indiana was originally conceived by Sun Microsystems, to construct a binary distribution around the OpenSolaris source code base. Project Indiana was led by Ian Murdock, founder of the Debian Linux distribution.

OpenIndiana was conceived after negotiations of a takeover of Sun Microsystems by Oracle were proceeding, in order to ensure continued availability and further development of an OpenSolaris-based OS, as it is widely used. Uncertainty among the OpenSolaris development community led some developers to form tentative plans for a fork of the existing codebase.

These plans came to fruition following the announcement of discontinuation of support for the OpenSolaris project by Oracle.

=== Initial reaction ===
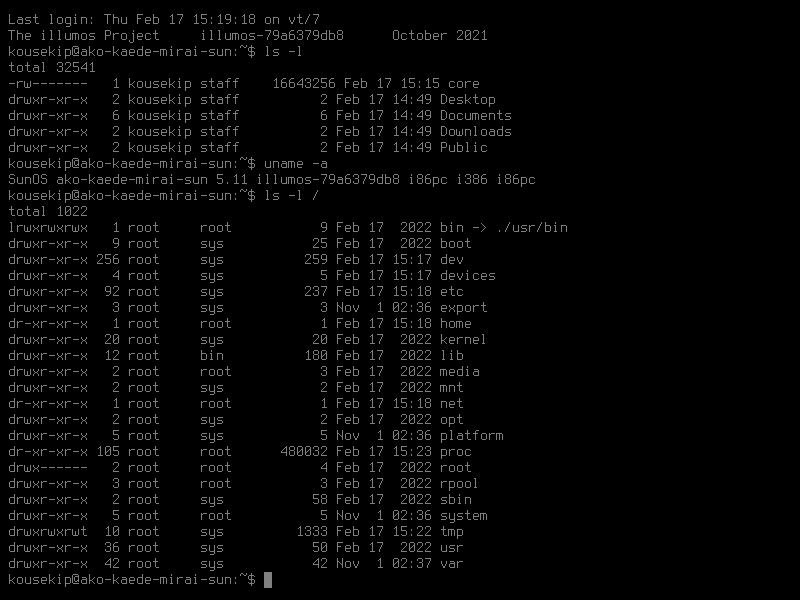
OpenIndiana operating in console mode

The formal announcement of the OpenIndiana project was made on September 14, 2010, at the JISC Centre in London. The first release of the operating system was made available publicly at the same time, despite being untested. The reason for the untested release was that the OpenIndiana team set a launch date ahead of Oracle OpenWorld in order to beat the release of Solaris 11 Express.

The announcement of OpenIndiana was met with a mainly positive response; over 350 people viewed the online announcement, the ISO image was downloaded over 2000 times, the Twitter account obtained over 500 followers, and numerous notable IT press websites wrote about the release. The broadcast bandwidth of the announcement was substantial, noted to top 350 Mbit/second. The network package depot server experienced 20x as much traffic interested in their distribution than they originally planned for, resulting in more threads later being provisioned.

Not all reporting was positive, though, as some online articles questioned the relevance of Solaris given the market penetration of Linux. One article was critical of the OpenIndiana launch, citing a lack of professionalism with regard to releasing an untested build, and the project's lack of commitment to a release schedule. The initial OpenIndiana release was advertised as experimental and directly based on the latest OpenSolaris development build, preliminary to the OpenSolaris 2010 release.

=== Community building ===
With the OpenSolaris binary distribution moved to SolarisExpress and the real-time feed of OpenSolaris updates discontinued, concerns abounded over what would happen to OpenIndiana if Oracle decided to stop feeding source code back into the community. The OpenIndiana team mitigated these concerns when they announced their intention to move the source code feed to the illumos Foundation.

Concerns were raised about possible discontinuation of free access to the Oracle-owned compiler being used to produce OpenIndiana. In response, OpenIndiana was modified to be able to compile under the open source GNU Compiler Collection.

The Hardware Compatibility List (HCL) remains somewhat informal, fragmented and uncentralized, requiring much end-user research for hardware selection. The lack of a comprehensive centralized HCL follows from the fact that the OpenSolaris HCL was hosted on Oracle server infrastructure and the server-side code for the Device Driver Utility submission was not made available.

In August 2012, founding project lead Alasdair Lumsden stepped down from the project, citing personal reasons and frustration with the lack of progress made on the project. Among the reasons for lack of progress were lack of developers and resources. In his resignation, Lumsden wrote, "For many of us this was the first open source project we had ever contributed to, myself included. The task at hand was vast, and we were ill equipped to deal with it."

Since Lumsden's resignation, the project is developed by a team of volunteers and is a completely horizontal and participative community effort.

=== Media reception ===
A September 2013 DistroWatch review stated that the OpenIndiana project has "seemingly been in steady decline for the last couple of years." The same review concluded that OpenIndiana had not progressed significantly from the state of OpenSolaris five years before:

Running OpenIndiana today feels much the same as running OpenSolaris five years ago, the tools are mostly the same, the desktop is the same. The software included is starting to show its age and I don't feel any truly significant features have been introduced in the past few years. I'm sure the developers behind the project are doing a good job of hunting down bugs and keeping drivers current, and that is great. Still, I feel as though OpenIndiana is treading water, not progressing in any meaningful way.

A May 2015 DistroWatch review of OpenIndiana similarly concluded that little major progress had been made to the system over the years. The review stated that the package selection and hardware support seemed to lag behind other systems, while many of the system administration features have either replicated or ported to Linux and BSD. The review concludes that:

While OpenIndiana appears to still be stable and functional, it also gives the impression of being stuck in the past, possibly due to a lack of developers willing to work on the project. OpenIndiana runs and may still be useful in situations where, for various reasons, the administrator really needs a version of Solaris, but it seems to me as though OpenIndiana has not moved forward in the past seven years. The operating system still features some great ideas and good technology, but it does not appear to have made any progress in recent years.

Claims about lack of package support may be mitigated by the fact that the 3500+ software packages provided by OpenIndiana Hipster are not split into several packages, which would artificially increase the package count (e.g. like in Linux distributions): the Image Packaging System is a file-based package management providing incremental updates and package facets, making such splitting an unnecessary burden. In the course of the first two years of its existence, the Hipster project has migrated and updated over 1500 packages: it maintains a collection of selected software packages while relying on third-party repositories like SFE for add-ons. For extended selection, the pkgsrc system supported by Joyent readily provides 20000+ packages for illumos systems.

== Relation to other operating systems ==
The project intends to deliver a System V family operating system which is binary-compatible with the Oracle products Solaris 11 and Solaris 11 Express. However, rather than being based on the OS/Net consolidation like OpenSolaris was, OpenIndiana is based on illumos. The project does use the same Image Packaging System (IPS) package management system as OpenSolaris.

While the OpenIndiana codebase was initially based on the majority of publicly available code from Oracle, this is not the case since the oi_151a Development Builds which are based on illumos from September 2011 onwards. The project has effectively moved away from Oracle-owned tools such as Sun Studio: all builds since 2013, including the active Hipster branch, use the GNU Compiler Collection (GCC) as sole compiler. The illumos project itself is built with GCC since June 15, 2012.

== Release schedule ==
Legend
Experimental Builds	Development Builds	Hipster/Gnome	Hipster/MATE

=== Experimental builds ===
The first experimental release of OpenIndiana, Build 147, was released on September 14, 2010; the second experimental release, Build 148, was released on December 17, 2010.

Version	Date	Notes
oi_147	September 10, 2010	"Release Notes OpenIndiana oi_147". Archived from the original on 2010-11-25.
oi_148	December 17, 2010	"Release Notes OpenIndiana oi_148". Archived from the original on 2015-10-10.

=== Development builds ===
A first development release, Build 151 was released on September 14, 2011. This is the first release to be based upon illumos. MartUX 151a0 was released as the first SPARC build for OpenIndiana. Build 151a7 for Intel/AMD architectures was released on October 6, 2012. Build 151a8 was released August 10, 2013. OpenSXCE 2013.01 SPARC Build 151a, formerly MartUX, was released through OpenIndiana on February 1, 2013, as the second and possibly last OpenIndiana SPARC build, with subsequent releases based upon DilOS.

Version	Date	Notes
oi_151a0	September 19, 2011	"Release Notes OpenIndiana oi_151a0". Archived from the original on 2018-06-21.
oi_151a1	January 26, 2012	"Release Notes OpenIndiana oi_151a1". Archived from the original on 2018-04-30.
oi_151a2	February 13, 2012	"Release Notes OpenIndiana oi_151a2". Archived from the original on 2018-04-30.
oi_151a3	April 12, 2012	"Release Notes OpenIndiana oi_151a3". Archived from the original on 2018-05-01.
oi_151a4	May 4, 2012	"Release Notes OpenIndiana oi_151a4". Archived from the original on 2018-04-30.
oi_151a5	July 2, 2012	"Release Notes OpenIndiana oi_151a5". Archived from the original on 2017-11-07.
oi_151a6	September 4, 2012	"Release Notes OpenIndiana oi_151a6". Archived from the original on 2018-05-01.
oi_151a7	October 6, 2012	"Release Notes OpenIndiana oi_151a7". Archived from the original on 2018-04-30.
oi_151a8	August 10, 2013	"Release Notes OpenIndiana oi_151a8". Archived from the original on 2018-04-30.
oi_151a9	January 18, 2014	"Release Notes OpenIndiana oi_151a9". Archived from the original on 2018-04-30.

=== Hipster ===
Since the development model inherited from the OpenSolaris project was unsuitable for a community project, the Hipster initiative was created late 2013 to reboot and modernize OpenIndiana. The Hipster project is a fast development branch of OpenIndiana based on a rolling-release model and a horizontal contribution scheme through the oi-userland build system and the use of continuous integration.

Hipster is actively maintained: the repository receives software updates as well as security fixes, and installation images are published twice a year. Every snapshot release is announced via mailing list and Twitter. The first snapshot release was delivered on February 14, 2014, and subsequent snapshots were based on a six-month development cycle.

Some notable features of Hipster:

- MATE as the default desktop environment (since Hipster 2016.10)
- Update to newer illumos KVM
- Update of the graphic stack with newer Xorg and DRM support
- Support for FUSE and NTFS-3G
- Support for multimedia software
- Support for third-party SFE repository providing LibreOffice
- Migration to GCC as default compiler
- Migration of legacy software consolidations to unified build system

The list of features is updated for each development cycle on the Roadmap page of the issue tracker.

Version	Date	Notes
2014.02	February 14, 2014	"Release Notes OpenIndiana Hipster 2014.02".
2014.07	July 1, 2014	"Release Notes OpenIndiana Hipster 2014.07".
2014.10	October 12, 2014	"Release Notes OpenIndiana Hipster 2014.10".
2015.03	March 30, 2015	"2015.03 Release notes".
2015.10	October 3, 2015	"2015.10 Release notes".
2016.04	April 21, 2016	"2016.04 Release notes".
2016.10	October 30, 2016	"2016.10 Release notes".
2017.04	May 2, 2017	"2017.04 Release notes".
2017.10	October 31, 2017	"2017.10 Release notes".
2018.04	April 27, 2018	"2018.04 Release notes".
2018.10	October 23, 2018	"2018.10 Release notes".
2019.04	May 11, 2019	"2019.04 Release notes".
2019.10	November 6, 2019	"2019.10 Release notes".
2020.04	May 4, 2020	"2020.04 Release notes".
2020.10	October 31, 2020	"2020.10 Release notes".
2021.04	May 1, 2021	"OpenIndiana Hipster 2021.04 is here".
2021.10	December 5, 2021	"OpenIndiana Hipster 2021.10 is here".
2022.10	December 4, 2022	"OpenIndiana Hipster 2022.10 is here".
2023.04	April 21, 2023	"Release of 23.04".
2023.05	May 4, 2023	"Security Release 2023.05".
2023.10	October 28, 2023	"Release 2023.10".
2024.04	April 28, 2024	"Release 2024.04".
2024.10	October 26, 2024	"Snapshots 2024.10".
2025.04	April 2, 2025	"Snapshots 2025.04".
2025.10	October 28, 2025	"Snapshot 2025.10 Available".
2026.04	May 5, 2026	"Snapshot 2026.04 Available".
