= List of software package management systems =

This is a list of notable software package manager systems, categorized first by package format (binary, source code, hybrid) and then by operating system family.

== Binary packages ==
The following package manager systems distribute software in binary package form; i.e., all executables are compiled and ready to install and use.

=== Unix-like ===
==== Linux ====
- dpkg: Originally used by Debian and now by Ubuntu and derivatives. Uses the .deb format and was the first to have a widely known dependency resolution tool, APT. The ncurses-based front-end for APT, aptitude, is also a popular package manager for Debian-based systems;
- Flatpak: A containerized/sandboxed packaging format formerly named xdg-app;
- Snap: Cross-distribution containerized package manager, non-free on the server-side, originally developed for Ubuntu;
- Nix: Aims to make package management reliable and reproducible. It provides atomic upgrades and rollbacks, side-by-side installation of multiple versions of a package, multi-user package management, and easy setup of build environments;
- GNU Guix: Used by the GNU Guix System. It is based on Nix, with Guile Scheme APIs. The default channel in the GNU Guix System omits proprietary software, but users can add third party channels without this restriction;
- Pacman: Used in Arch Linux, Frugalware and DeLi Linux. Its binary package format is a compressed tar archive (default file extension: .pkg.tar.zst) built using the makepkg utility (which comes bundled with pacman) and a specialized type of shell script called a PKGBUILD. Pacman is often used indirectly via wrappers with AUR support such as aura, pakku, paru, pikaur, trizen, and yay.
- Pamac: A frontend to pacman with both a CLI and a GUI, built and maintained by Manjaro;
- Portage: A package management system invoked by the emerge command, originally created for and used by Gentoo Linux;
  - Entropy: Used by and created for Sabayon Linux. It works with binary packages that are bzip2-compressed tar archives (file extension: .tbz2), that are created using Entropy, from tbz2 binaries produced by Portage from ebuilds, a type of specialized shell script;
- RPM Package Manager: Created by Red Hat. RPM is the Linux Standard Base packaging format and the base of a number of additional tools:
  - APT-RPM: an APT-like frontend to RPM;
  - openSUSE's ZYpp (zypper);
  - Fedora's DNF and YUM, also used by Red Hat Enterprise Linux and Yellow Dog Linux;
- slackpkg;
  - netpkg: The package manager used by Zenwalk. Compatible with Slackware package management tools;
  - slapt-get: An APT-like package manager for Slackware;
- XBPS (X Binary Package System): Used by Void Linux.
- apk-tools: Used by Alpine Linux. Originally a collection of shell scripts, but has been since rewritten in C.

==== Linux (discontinued) ====
- OpenPKG: Cross-platform package management system based on RPM Package Manager;
- PISI: Stands for "Packages Installed Successfully as Intended"; used by Pisi Linux. Pardus used to use Pisi, but migrated to APT in 2013.
- Red Hat's up2date, an out-of-date/discontinued predecessor to YUM.

==== Android ====
- Accrescent
- Amazon Appstore: Alternative app store for Android devices;
- Aptoide: application for installing mobile applications which runs on the Android operating system. In Aptoide there is no centralized store; instead, each user manages their own store.
- F-Droid: Alternative app store for Android, whose official repository contains only free software;
- Samsung Galaxy Store: An app store developed by Samsung for Android, Tizen, Windows Mobile and Bada devices.
- GetJar: An independent mobile phone app store founded in Lithuania in 2004;
- Google Play: Online app store developed by Google for Android devices that license the proprietary Google Application set;
- Huawei AppGallery: An app store developed by Huawei for Android devices and HarmonyOS devices;
- SlideME: Alternative app store for Android.

==== BSD ====
- FreeBSD pkg – FreeBSD binary packages are built on top of source based FreeBSD Ports and managed with the pkg tool;
- OpenBSD ports: The infrastructure behind the binary packages on OpenBSD;
- pkgsrc: A cross-platform package manager, with regular binary packages provided for NetBSD, Linux and macOS by multiple vendors;
- dpkg: Used as part of Debian GNU/kFreeBSD;
- OpenPKG: Cross-platform package management system based on rpm;
- PC-BSD: Up to and including version 8.2 uses files with the .pbi (Push Button Installer) filename extension which, when double-clicked, bring up an installation wizard program. Each PBI is self-contained and uses de-duplicated private dependencies to avoid version conflicts. An autobuild system tracks the FreeBSD ports collection and generates new PBIs daily. PC-BSD also uses the FreeBSD pkg binary package system; new packages are built approximately every two weeks from both a stable and rolling release branch of the FreeBSD ports tree.

==== macOS (OS X) ====
- Mac App Store: Official digital distribution platform for OS X apps. Part of OS X 10.7 and available as an update for OS X 10.6;
- Fink: A port of dpkg, it is one of the earliest package managers for macOS;
- Homebrew: Command-Line Interface-based package manager, known for its ease-of-use and extensibility.
- MacPorts: Formerly named DarwinPorts, based on FreeBSD Ports (as is macOS);
- Joyent: Provides a repository of 10,000+ binary packages for macOS based on pkgsrc;

==== Solaris, illumos ====
- Image Packaging System (IPS, also known as "pkg(5)"): Used by Solaris, OpenSolaris, and Illumos distributions like OpenIndiana and OmniOS;
- pkgsrc: SmartOS, OS distribution of Illumos from Joyent. Uses pkgsrc, can be bootstrapped to use on OpenIndiana;
- OpenCSW: Community supported collection of packages in SysV format for SunOS 5.8-5.11 (Solaris 8-11);
- OpenPKG: Cross-platform package management system based on RPM Package Manager.

==== iOS ====
- App Store: Official app store for iOS apps;
- Cydia: Frontend to a port of APT. Maintained by the jailbreak community.

=== Windows ===
- Microsoft Store: Official app store for Universal Windows Platform apps on Windows NT and Windows 10 Mobile. As of Windows 11, it distributes video games and films as well;
- Windows Package Manager (aka winget): Free and open-source package manager designed for Microsoft Windows;
- Chocolatey: Open-source decentralized package manager for Windows in the spirit of Yum and apt-get. Usability wrapper for NuGet;
- Cygwin: Free and open-source software repository for Windows NT. Provides many Linux tools and an installation tool with package manager;
- Homebrew: a port of the MacOS package manager meant for use with Windows Subsystem for Linux, using the already existing Linux port as its base;
- Ninite: Proprietary package manager for Windows NT;
- NuGet: A Microsoft-official free and open-source package manager for Windows, available as a plug-in for Visual Studio, and extendable from the command-line;
- Pacman: MSYS2-ported Windows version of the Arch Linux package manager;
- Scoop Package Manager: free and open-source package manager for Windows
- wpkg: Open-source package manager that handles Debian packages on Windows. Started as a clone of dpkg, and has many apt-get like features too;

Superseded:

- Windows Phone Store: Former official app store for Windows Phone. Now superseded by Microsoft Store;

=== z/OS ===
- SMP/E.

== Source code-based ==
The following package management systems distribute the source code of their apps. Either the user must know how to compile the packages, or they come with a script that automates the compilation process. For example, in GoboLinux a recipe file contains information on how to download, unpack, compile and install a package using its Compile tool. In both cases, the user must provide the computing power and time needed to compile the app, and is legally responsible for the consequences of compiling the package.

=== BSD ===
- FreeBSD Ports is an original implementation of source based software management system commonly referred to as Ports collection. It gave way and inspired many others systems;
- OpenBSD ports is a Perl based reimplementation of ports collection;

=== Linux ===
- ABS is used by Arch Linux to automate binary packages building from source or even other binary archives, with automatic download and dependency checking;
- apt-build is used by distributions which use deb packages, allowing automatic compiling and installation of software in a deb source repository;
- Sorcery is Sourcemage GNU/Linux's bash based package management program that automatically downloads software from their original site and compiles and installs it on the local machine;

=== macOS (OS X) ===
- Fink, for OS X, derives partially from dpkg/apt and partially from ports;
- MacPorts, formerly called DarwinPorts, originated from the OpenDarwin project;
- Homebrew, with close Git integration;
- pkgsrc can be used to install software directly from source-code, or to use the binary packages provided by several independent vendors.

== Hybrid systems ==
- Nix: Package manager that manages software in a purely functional programming way, with multi-user support, atomic upgrades, and rollbacks. Allows installing multiple versions or variants of software at the same time. Supports macOS and cross-Linux distributions;
- Portage and emerge are used by Gentoo Linux, Funtoo Linux, and Sabayon Linux. It is inspired by the BSD ports collection and uses text based ebuilds to automatically download, customize, build, and update packages from source code. It has automatic dependency checking and allows installing multiple versions of a software package in different slots on the same system. Has use flags to allow fully customizing a software build to suit the needs of a platform in an automated way. While source code distributing and customizing is the preferred method, some larger packages that would take many hours to compile on a typical desktop computer are also offered as pre-compiled binaries to ease installing;
- Upkg: Package manager and build system based on Mono and XML specifications. Used by paldo and formerly by ExTiX Linux;
- MacPorts for macOS;
- NetBSD's pkgsrc works on several Unix-like operating systems, with regular binary packages for macOS and Linux provided by multiple independent vendors;
- Collective Knowledge is a cross-platform package and workflow framework with JSON API that can download binary packages or build them from sources for Linux, Windows, macOS, and Android platforms.

== Meta package managers ==
The following unify package management for several or all Linux and sometimes Unix variants. These, too, are based on the concept of a recipe file.

- AppImage (formerly klik and PortableLinuxApps) aims to provide an easy way to get software packages for most major distributions without the dependency problems so common in many other package formats.
- Autopackage uses .package files.
- PackageKit is a set of utilities and libraries for creating applications that can manage packages across multiple package managers using back-ends to call the correct program.

== Game package managers ==
Package management systems geared toward developing and distributing video games.

- Steam: A cross-platform video game distribution, licensing and social gameplay platform, developed and maintained by Valve. Used to shop for, download, install, update, uninstall and back up video games. Works on Windows NT, OS X and Linux
- Uplay: A cross-platform video game distribution, licensing and social gameplay platform, developed and maintained by Ubisoft. Used to shop for, download, install and update video games. Works on Windows NT and Windows Phone, as well as PlayStation 3, PlayStation 4, Xbox 360, Xbox One, Wii U, iOS and Android.
- Xbox Live: A cross-platform video game distribution platform by Microsoft. Works on Windows NT, Windows Phone and Xbox. Initially called Games for Windows – Live on Windows 7 and earlier. On Windows 10, the distribution function is taken over by Windows Store

== Proprietary software systems ==
A wide variety of package management systems are in common use today by proprietary software operating systems, handling the installation of both proprietary and free packages.

== Application-level package managers ==
- Bitnami: a library of installers or software packages for web applications
- Cargo: is Rust's build system and package manager. It downloads, compiles, distributes, and uploads packages—called crates
- CocoaPods: a dependency manager for Swift and Objective-C Cocoa projects
- Composer: a dependency manager for PHP
- Conda: a package manager for open data science platform of the Python and R
- CPAN: a programming library and package manager for Perl
- CRAN: a programming library and package manager for R
- CTAN: a package manager for TeX
- Deno: a JavaScript runtime that functions as its own package manager
- Docker: Docker, a system for managing containers, serves as a package manager for deploying containerized applications
- Enthought Canopy: a package manager for Python scientific and analytic computing distribution and analysis environment
- Gradle: a build system and package manager for Java and other JVM languages, and also C++
- Ivy: a package manager for Java, integrated into the Ant build tool, also used by sbt
- Leiningen: a project automation tool for Clojure
- LuaRocks: a programming library and package manager for Lua
- Maven: a package manager and build tool for Java
- npm: a programming library and package manager for Node.js and JavaScript
- NuGet: the package manager for the Microsoft development platform including .NET Framework and Xamarin
- PAR::Repository and Perl package manager: binary package managers for Perl
- PEAR: a programming library for PHP
- pip: a package manager for Python and the PyPI programming library
- Podman: an open source Open Container Initiative (OCI)-compliant container management tool
- RubyGems: a package manager and repository for Ruby
- sbt: a build tool for Scala, uses Ivy for dependency management
- vcpkg: a package manager and repository for C/C++ developed by Microsoft
- yarn: an alternative to npm for Node.js and JavaScript

== Meta server application-level package manager ==
- Sonatype Nexus Repository
- Jfrog Artifactory
- Artifact Keeper
- RepoFlow
- ProGet by Inedo
- Cloudsmith
- GitHub Packages

== See also ==
- Binary repository manager
- Package format
- Linux package formats
- List of Linux distributions
- App stores — The commercial version of a package manager, focusing on payment and closed source software.
