= TextDrive =

- Company type: Private
- Industry: Web hosting service
- Founded: 2004; Relaunched: 2012
- Headquarters: San Francisco, CA
- Key people: Dean Allen (CEO)
- Products: Web and cloud services
- Divisions: Cloud Hosting
- Website: www.textdrive.com

TextDrive was founded in 2004 by the Canadian typographer, art director, designer, writer and programmer Dean Allen, the creator of Textile markup, who was looking to create an ideal hosting environment for the content management system he was developing, Textpattern. TextDrive was incorporated in California in May 2004 with Allen as chief executive officer and Jason Hoffman as president and chief operating officer. TextDrive was positioned as "a hosting company run by and for people who love publishing on the web."

== Lifetime hosting crisis at Joyent, relaunch and shutdown of TextDrive ==
On August 16, 2012, individuals who had provided start-up and development funding to Joyent (and its predecessor, TextDrive) in exchange for lifetime shared hosting accounts with Joyent were informed, via email, that their lifetime hosting accounts would be deleted on October 31, 2012. Depending on the nature of their initial investment, they were offered either one or three free years of hosting on a Joyent SmartMachine, the company's cloud hosting solution, after which they would be moved to a regularly billed account. Customer backlash to the announcement turned out to be fierce.

On August 30, 2012, TextDrive co-founder Dean Allen announced that he was relaunching TextDrive as a separate company which will carry on Joyent's shared hosting business and honor the "lifetime" agreements. Allen relaunched TextDrive in late 2012 using Joyent infrastructure. At the time, he was confident he would succeed in building a viable business similar to DreamHost.

On March 3, 2014, Dean Allen announced the shutdown of TextDrive:

As anyone looking for decent support or even useful information over the past few months can attest, the revival of TextDrive has not been a success.

What began in mid-2012 as an exciting challenge fuelled by good intentions and lean resources quickly turned into a cleanup project with almost no resources.

It is disappointing to report that after a year and a half of uphill battles and unimagined setbacks, after several costly efforts to regroup and find another way, options to keep TextDrive growing have run out, and we will cease operations on the 14th of March, 2014.

For those who wish to know, details of what went wrong will be made available once shutdown operations have completed.

Sorry to have let you down.

Dean
