= Textile (disambiguation) =

Textile may refer to:

- Textile, any type of material made from fibers or other extended linear materials such as thread or yarn
- Textile industry, also known as the "rag trade"
- Textile (markup language)
- A slang term used by naturists to refer to non-nudists
- The Philadelphia College of Textiles & Science (now Thomas Jefferson University)
