= Nanoc =

- Original author: Denis Defreyne
- Stable release: 4.14.6 / December 31, 2025
- Written in: Ruby
- License: MIT
- Website: nanoc.denisdefreyne.com

Nanoc is a Ruby-based website compiler that generates static HTML. It supports compiling from various markup languages, including Markdown, Textile, and Haml. It can generate and lay out pages with a consistent look and feel. Nanoc is not a content management system, however it acts somewhat like one.

== Advantages of Nanoc ==
In comparison to other static site generators, Nanoc has a modular architecture.

== Differences from traditional content management systems ==
Although Nanoc sometimes acts as a content management system (CMS), there are many differences.

- Traditional CMSs must assemble the webpage every time a user requests it. Static HTML pages are pre-assembled and as such do not have to be re-assembled.
- CMSs run using a server-side language, which exposes the CMS to all the vulnerabilities of the language. Since Nanoc compiles websites to static HTML, the only vulnerabilities are that of the web server itself.
- The content managed by a CMS can usually be changed at any time through a web interface. Since Nanoc must recompile the website at every change, it is more difficult to modify a website.
