= .pkg =

Filename extension

PKG
- Filename extension: .pkg
- Developed by: Apple Inc., Sony Computer Entertainment, Symbian Ltd.
- Container for: Applications

.pkg (package) is a filename extension used for several file formats that contain packages of software and other files to be installed onto a certain device, operating system, or filesystem, such as macOS, iOS, the PlayStation Vita, the PlayStation 3, the PlayStation 4 and the PlayStation 5.

- macOS and iOS use .pkg extensions for Apple software packages using the Xar format internally.
- PlayStation Vita, PlayStation 3, PlayStation 4, PlayStation 5 – used for installation of PlayStation Vita, PlayStation 3, PlayStation 4 and PlayStation 5 software, applications, homebrew, and DLC from the PlayStation Store
- System V Release 4 (SVR4) .pkg files are cpio archives that contain specific file tree structures. They are software packages that can be installed, removed and tracked using the pkgadd, pkgrm, and pkginfo commands. The SVR4-based Solaris, and the Solaris-based illumos, support that package format.
- Symbian use .pkg files to store configuration information used to generate .sis installer packages.
- BeOS used .pkg files as part of their software packaging platform. The package format was used after Be Inc. bought Starcode Software Inc. and acquired their packaging tools.
- Apple Newton operating system used files ending in .pkg for Newton applications and software. As a result, when seen from the Mac OS X Finder, Newton applications appear the same as Mac OS X Installer packages; however, they do not share their file format.
- PTC/CoCreate 3D Modeling application use .pkg files to store model files. This .pkg file uses the ZIP file format.
- Microsoft is said to use .pkg files for profile storage on Xbox Network.
- L3 Avionics systems use some .pkg files for software updates.

== See also ==
- List of software package management systems
