= Fink (software) =

Project to port and package open-source Unix software to macOS

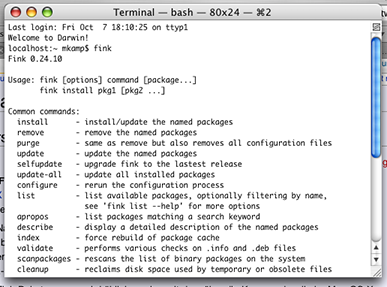
- Screenshot of Fink running in Terminal
- Release: 2000
- Stable release: 0.45.6 / February 19, 2022; 4 years ago
- Written in: Perl
- Operating system: macOS
- Type: Package management system
- License: GNU General Public License
- Website: www.finkproject.org
- Repository: github.com/fink/fink

The Fink project is an effort to port and package open-source Unix programs to macOS. Fink uses dpkg and APT (Debian's package management system), as well as its own frontend program, fink (which is implemented as a set of Perl modules).

== Implementation ==
Fink features a binary distribution for quick and easy installation using APT, as well as a more extensive source distribution. In addition to command-line tools for handling packages, the shareware app Phynchronicity provides a GUI.

Fink can be used to install newer versions of packages installed by macOS or to install packages not included in macOS by Apple edict. Fink stores all its data in the directory /opt/sw for newer macOS releases and /sw for macOS 10.14 and earlier (although this can be changed if initially compiling fink itself from source code). This goes against the Filesystem Hierarchy Standard's recommendation to use the /usr/local prefix; the reasons given in the Fink FAQ are that other installers might overwrite Fink's files under /usr/local, and that having an entirely separate directory makes it easier to disable the binaries and libraries that Fink installs. MacPorts, another macOS package manager, follows a similar approach by storing its data in /opt/local by default. Within Fink's directory, a FHS-like layout (/sw/bin, /sw/include, /sw/lib, etc.) is used.

Fink creates a dedicated directory tree at /sw (or /opt/sw on newer macOS). This is essentially a "sandbox" for your Unix environment.

== History ==
The Fink project was started in December 2000 by German hacker Christoph Pfisterer. The name Fink is German for finch and is a reference to the name of the macOS core, Darwin; Charles Darwin's study of diversity among finches led him eventually to the concept of natural selection.

Christoph Pfisterer left the project in November 2001. Since then, several people have stepped in and picked up support for Fink. As of March 2008, the project was managed by 6 administrators, 89 developers, and an active community. As of March 2014, the Fink core team were made up of nine active developers, who are responsible for the central management of the project and maintain the "essential" packages.

The Fink community regularly adds support for the latest versions of macOS with their release. Latest Fink versions, starting with version 0.45.0, support up to MacOS Catalina. Support for MacOS Big Sur and Monterey is being worked on.

== Awards ==
- 2023 Open Science Award for Open Source Research Software in the category "Jury's Favourite" (Coup de cœur du jury)

== See also ==
- Gentoo/Alt
- Homebrew
- MacPorts
- Pkgsrc
- Cydia
