= Bhyve =

BSD Hypervisor

- Developer: The FreeBSD Project
- Initial release: 2014; 11 years ago
- Repository: github.com/freebsd/freebsd-src/tree/main/usr.sbin/bhyve
- Written in: C
- Operating system: FreeBSD, illumos
- Type: Hypervisor
- License: FreeBSD License
- Website: bhyve.org

bhyve (pronounced "bee hive", formerly written as BHyVe for "BSD hypervisor") is a type-2 (hosted) hypervisor initially written for FreeBSD. It can also be used on a number of illumos based distributions including SmartOS, OpenIndiana, and OmniOS. A port of bhyve to macOS called xhyve is also available.

== Features ==
bhyve supports the virtualization of several guest operating systems, including FreeBSD 9+, OpenBSD, NetBSD, Linux, illumos, DragonFly and Windows NT (Windows Vista and later, Windows Server 2008 and later). bhyve also supports UEFI installations and VirtIO emulated interfaces. Windows virtual machines require VirtIO drivers for a stable operation. Current development efforts aim at widening support for other operating systems for the x86-64 architecture.

Support for peripherals relies on basic and VirtIO drivers and supports: eXtensible Host Controller Interface (xHCI) USB controllers, NVM Express (NVMe) controllers, High Definition Audio Controllers, raw framebuffer device attached to VNC server (Video Output), and AHCI/PCI Passthrough.

Since the support for peripherals is incomplete, hardware-accelerated graphics is only available using PCI passthrough. But, Intel GVT (and other vGPUs with driver support) should allow sharing the device with the host.

bhyve performs about the same as its competitors with lack of memory ballooning and accelerated graphics interface, but bhyve has a more modern codebase and uses fewer resources. In the case of FreeBSD the resource management is more efficient. FreeBSD is also known for its exemplary I/O speeds; running bhyve from FreeBSD has a lot of advantages for time-critical virtual appliances by reducing I/O time, especially on disk and network related loads.

== Applications ==
- Docker on macOS uses a bhyve derivative called HyperKit. It is derived from xhyve, a port of bhyve to macOS's Hypervisor framework.
- iohyve on FreeBSD is a command-line utility to create, store, manage, and launch bhyve guests using built in FreeBSD features.
- vm-bhyve on FreeBSD is a shell-based, bhyve manager with minimal dependencies.
- BVCP on FreeBSD is a lightweight, native, full featured web interface for managing virtual machines.
- FreeNAS, based on FreeBSD, uses bhyve alongside its file sharing services to provide hosting for VMs.

== Other distributions ==
- ClonOS, a FreeBSD-based distribution for virtual hosting platform and appliance, primarily uses bhyve and has a web-based management interface.
- MyBee, a FreeBSD-based distribution for managing cloud VMs (bhyve) through a simplified API.
- SmartOS, an Illumos-based distribution for managing cloud VMs (bhyve, Solaris zones) through a simplified API.
- MidnightBSD, a desktop operating system, includes bhyve.
