= Open Science Award for Open Source Research Software =

French award

The Open Science Award for Open Source Research Software (French: Prix science ouverte du logiciel libre de la recherche) is a French scientific award given since 2022. The prize is part of the second National Plan for open science and rewards projects, teams and young researchers engaged in exemplary practices of management, dissemination and reuse of research data. It is awarded by the French Ministry of Higher Education and Research and Space.

The prize has four categories:

- The "Scientific and Technical" (Scientifique et technique) category rewards software that stands out for its scientific quality, methodological rigour and technical excellence.
- The "Community" (Communauté) category highlights projects that have successfully built and nurtured an active community of users and contributors.
- The "Documentation" category recognises software that offers exemplary documentation facilitating use, adoption and contribution to the project.
- The "Jury's Favourite" (Coup de cœur du jury) category rewards an exemplary project combining several of these dimensions.

In each category, the jury awards a main prize as well as a "rising star" (espoir) award for promising projects, typically started less than five years ago.

== Winners ==
Year	"Scientific and Technical" category	"Community" category	"Documentation" category	"Jury's Favourite" category	References
2022	Rocq, proof assistant software; Honourable mention: Alliance/Coriolis VLSI CAD Tools, a placement and routing tool for silicon integrated circuits	Scikit-learn, a free Python library for machine learning; Honourable mentions: Vidjil, software platform for analysing DNA sequences of white blood cells; WebObs, multidisciplinary real-time observation tool used for observing natural phenomena.	FAUST, programming language used in computer music research, particularly for sound synthesis, signal processing and digital instrument making.; Honourable mention: OpenViBE, neuroscience software that enables acquisition, filtering, processing, classification and real-time visualisation of brain signals.	Gammapy, astrophysics data analysis software for gamma-ray astronomy telescopes; Honourable mentions: Gama Platform, a simulation platform with a complete integrated development environment for modelling and simulation; SPPAS, computational linguistics and corpus linguistics software.	
2023	Smilei, particle-in-cell numerical simulation for plasma physics.; Honourable mention: PPanGGOLiN, bioinformatics software for pangenome analysis.	OCaml, functional programming language.; Honourable mention: NoiseCapture, collaborative application for measuring sound levels.	Brian, simulator for spiking biological neural networks.; KeOps, library for manipulating large matrices.	Hyphe, software for creating, cleaning and categorising "web corpora" as networks of links between websites.; Fink, set of services for the astrophysics community enabling the study of variable and transient phenomena.	·
2024	Ichthyop, simulation software for organism propagation in ocean currents.; Rising star: PyMoDAQ, free solution for data acquisition via sensors.	PARI/GP, computer algebra system for number theory research.; Rising star: archeoViz, software for spatial representation and analysis of archaeological data.	scikit-rf, Python library for radio frequency systems engineering and analysis.; Rising star: DeepInverse, PyTorch-based library for solving inverse imaging problems with deep learning.	SOFA Framework, interactive mechanical simulation platform.; Rising star: SPAM, software for quantitative analysis of 2D and 3D imaging data applied to mechanics.	
2025	GNU MPFR, free library for arbitrary-precision floating-point computing.; Rising star: Qumin, Python package for quantitative modelling of language inflectional morphology.	Aladin Lite, interactive sky atlas for visualising astronomical data.; Rising star: DifferentiationInterface.jl, Julia library providing a unified interface for automatic differentiation algorithms.	Pharo, free programming language descended from Smalltalk, where everything is an object.; Rising star: NeuRon Virtualizer, tool for simulating the electrical behaviour of peripheral nerves.	HyperSpy, open source Python framework for interactive visualisation and analysis of multi-dimensional data.; Rising star: SMASH, numerical simulation library for hydrologic phenomena.	

== See also ==
- Open science
- Open Science Award for Research Data (Prix science ouverte des données de la recherche)
