= FAUST (programming language) =

Audio programming language

- Paradigms: functional, visual
- Designed by: Yann Orlarey, Dominique Fober, Stéphane Letz
- Developers: GRAME, Centre National de Création Musicale
- First appeared: 2002; 24 years ago
- Stable release: 2.83.1 / December 14, 2025; 9 months ago
- Implementation language: C++
- Platform: ARM, x86-64
- OS: Linux, macOS, Windows, Unix
- License: GPL
- Website: faust.grame.fr

FAUST (Functional AUdio STream) is a domain-specific purely functional, text-based visual programming language for implementing signal processing algorithms in the form of libraries, audio plug-ins, or standalone applications. A FAUST program denotes a signal processor: a mathematical function that is applied to some input signal and then fed out. It is free and open-source software released with a GNU General Public License (GPL).

== Overview ==
The FAUST programming model combines a functional programming approach with a block diagram syntax:

- The functional programming approach provides a natural framework for signal processing. Digital signals are modeled as discrete functions of time, signal processors as second order functions that operate on them, and FAUST's block diagram composition operators, used to combine signal processors together, as third order functions, etc.
- Block diagrams, even if purely textual as in FAUST, promote a modular approach to signal processing that complies with sound engineers' and audio developers' habits. A FAUST program doesn't describe a sound or a group of sounds, but a signal processor. The program source is organized as a set of definitions with at least the definition of the keyword process (the equivalent of main in C):

process = ...;

The FAUST compiler translates FAUST code into a C++ object, which may then interface with other C++ code to produce a full program.

It can also transpile (translate) the FAUST digital signal processing (DSP) specification to: C, C++, C#, Cmajor, Codebox (Max), D, interpreter, Java, JSFX (REAPER), LLVM IR, Julia, Rust, and WebAssembly (Wast/Wasm).

The generated code works at the sample level. It is therefore suited to implement low-level DSP functions like recursive filters. The code may also be embedded. It is self-contained and does not depend on any DSP library or runtime system. It has a very deterministic behavior and a constant memory size.

The semantics of FAUST is driven to be simple and well-defined. It allows the FAUST compiler to be semantically driven. Instead of compiling a program literally, it compiles the mathematical function it denotes. This can promote component reuse. Moreover, having access to the exact semantics of a FAUST program can simplify preservation issues.

FAUST is a textual language but block diagram oriented. It combines two approaches: functional programming and algebraic block diagrams, which are constructed via function composition. For that, FAUST relies on a block diagram algebra of five composition operations.

== Example code ==
FAUST programs define a process function that operates on incoming data. This is analogous to the main function in most programming languages. The following is an example that produces silence:

process = 0;

The second example copies the input signal to the output. It involves the _ primitive that denotes the identity function for signals:

process = _;

Another example sums a stereo signal into a mono signal using the + primitive:

process = +;

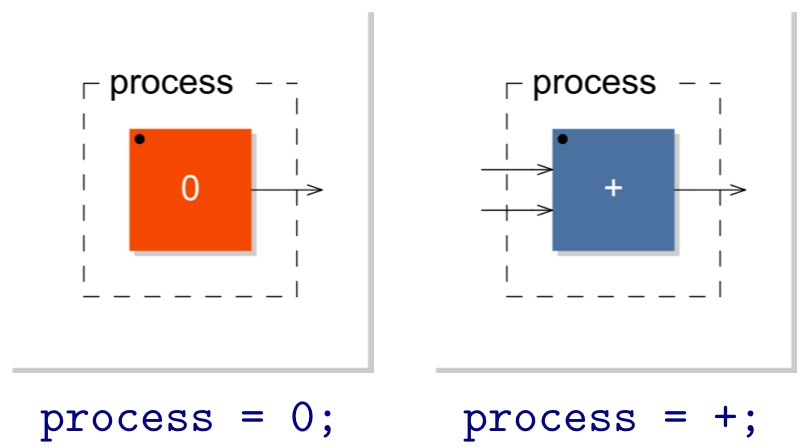
Block diagrams generated by Faust from some simple programs

Most FAUST primitives are analogous to their C counterpart on numbers, but lifted to signals. For example, the FAUST primitive sin operates on a signal X by applying the C function sin to each sample X[t]. All C numerical functions have their counterpart in FAUST. Some signal processing primitives are specific to FAUST. For example, the delay operator @ takes two input signals: X (the signal to be delayed) and D (the delay to be applied), and produces an output signal Y such that Y(t) = X(t − D(t)).

== Block diagram composition ==
Contrary to Max-like visual programming languages where the user does manual connections, FAUST primitives are assembled in block diagrams by using a set of high-level block diagram composition operations.

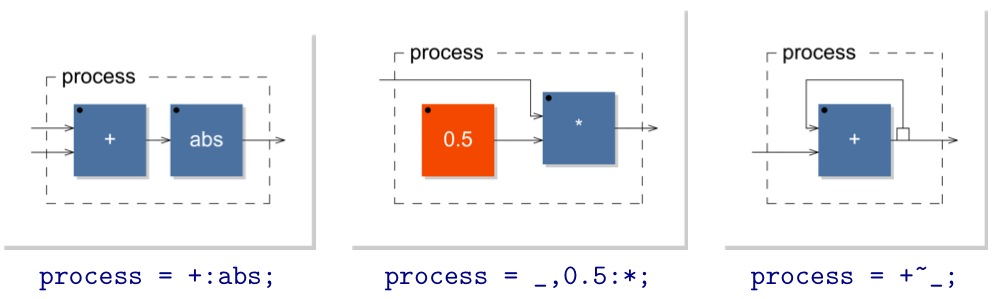
Simple examples of block diagram composition

The block diagram composition operators used in FAUST
f~g	Recursive composition (precedence 4)
f,g	Parallel composition (precedence 3)
f:g	Sequential composition (precedence 2)
f<:g	Split composition (precedence 1)
f:>g	Merge composition (precedence 1)

Using the sequential composition operator : the output of + can be routed to the input of abs to compute the absolute value of the signal:

process = + : abs;

Here is an example of parallel composition using the , operator that arranges its left and right expressions in parallel. This is analogous to a stereo cable.

process = _,_;

These operators can be combined arbitrarily. The following code multiplies an input signal with 0.5:

process = _,0.5 : *;

The above may be rewritten in curried form:

process = *(0.5);

The recursive composition operator ~ can be used to create block diagrams with cycles (that include an implicit one-sample delay). Here is an example of an integrator that takes an input signal X and computes an output signal Y such that Y(t) = X(t) + Y(t−1):

process = + ~ _;

== Generating full applications ==
Using specific architecture files, a FAUST program can be used to produce code for a variety of platforms and plug-in formats. These architecture files act as wrappers and describe the interactions with the host audio and GUI system. As of 2021, more than 30 architectures are supported and new ones may be implemented by anyone.

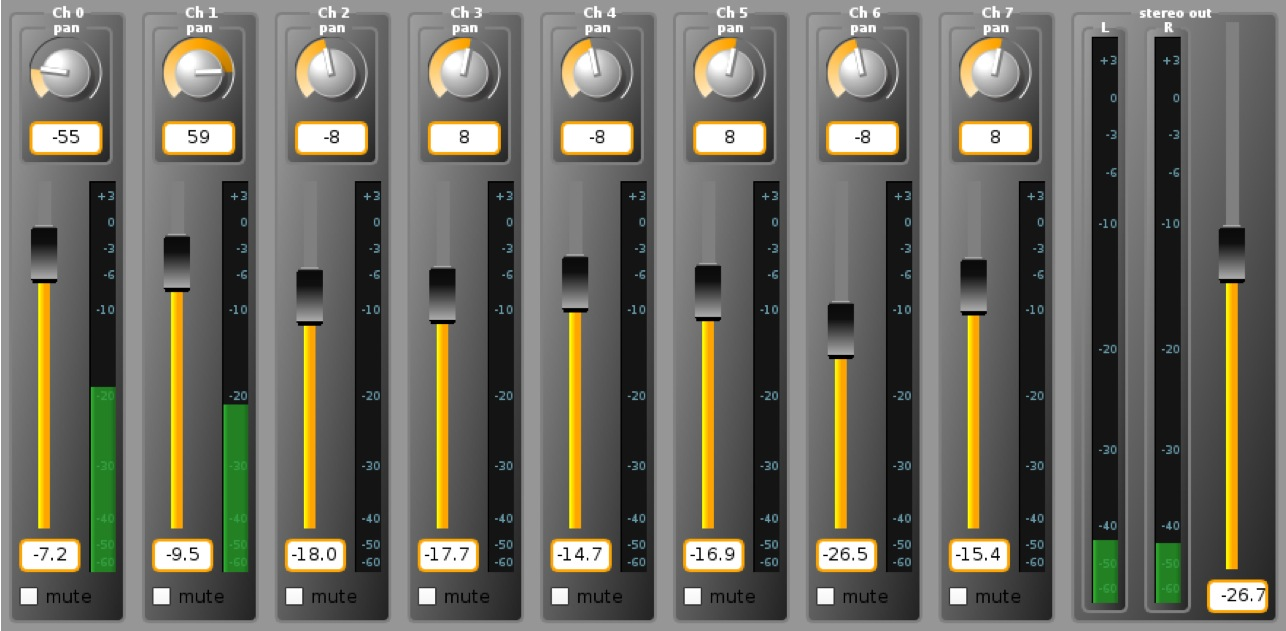
Screenshot of mixer.dsp (available in the FAUST distribution) using the jack-qt architecture

Some architecture files available for FAUST
File	Architecture
alsa-gtk.cpp	ALSA application + GTK
alsa-qt.cpp	ALSA application + Qt 4
android.cpp	Android applications
au.cpp	Audio Unit plug-in
ca-qt.cpp	CoreAudio application + Qt 4
ios-coreaudio.cpp	iPhone and iPad applications
jack-gtk.cpp	JACK application + GTK
jack-qt.cpp	JACK application + Qt 4
ladspa.cpp	LADSPA plug-in
max-msp.cpp	Max MSP plug-in
pd.cpp	Pure Data plug-in
q.cpp	Q language plug-in
supercollider.cpp	SuperCollider plug-in
vst.cpp	VST plug-in
vsti-mono.cpp	Monophonic VST Instrument plug-in
vsti-poly.cpp	Polyphonic VST Instrument plug-in

== Generating block diagrams ==
A useful option makes it possible to generate the block diagram representation of the program as one or more SVG graphic files.

This is not a direct representation of the C++ code generated, and is instead used to generate code that can calculate the mathematical function it denotes.

== Arrows-like semantics ==
The Faust semantics is almost the same as that of Haskell Arrows type class. However, the Arrow class is not bound to signal processors.

Equivalences between FAUST and Arrow combinators
f~g	loop ((\(a,b) -> (b,a)) ^>> f >>> id &&& (delay>>>g)) where delay is not a method of the Arrow type class, but is specific to signal processing arrows
f,g	f***g
f:g	f>>>g
f<:g	f>>^h>>>g with appropriate function h (or &&& in special cases)
f:>g	f>>^h>>>g with appropriate function h

The Arrow combinators are more restrictive than their FAUST counterparts, e.g., the nesting of parallel composition is preserved, and inputs of the operands of &&& must match exactly.

== Awards ==
- 2022 Open Science Award for Open Source Research Software in the category "Documentation".
