= Joyent =

American software and services company

Joyent Inc.
- Type: Subsidiary
- Industry: Computer Software
- Genre: Cloud infrastructure
- Founded: 2004; 22 years ago
- Headquarters: San Francisco, California, U.S.
- Products: Triton Compute, Node.js, SmartOS
- Number of employees: 125 (June 2017)
- Parent: Independent (2004–2016); Samsung (2016–present)
- Divisions: Cloud Software, Cloud Hosting
- Website: www.joyent.com

Joyent Inc. is a software and services company based in San Francisco, California. Specializing in cloud computing, it markets infrastructure-as-a-service. On June 15, 2016, the company was acquired by Samsung Electronics.

== Services ==
Triton, Joyent's hosting unit, was designed to compete with Amazon's Elastic Compute Cloud (EC2) and offered infrastructure as a service (IaaS) and platform as a service (PaaS) for large enterprises.

This hosting business was used for online social network gaming, where it provides services to companies such as THQ, Social Game Universe, and Traffic Marketplace.

The company also hosted Twitter in its early days. Other customers include LinkedIn, Gilt Groupe, and Kabam.

In June 2013 Joyent introduced an object storage service under the name Manta and partnered in September 2013 with network appliance vendor Riverbed to offer an inexpensive content-delivery network. In February 2014, Joyent announced a partnership with Canonical to offer virtual Ubuntu machines.

== Software ==
Joyent uses and supports open source projects, including Node.js, pkgsrc, Illumos and SmartOS, which is its own distribution of Illumos, featuring its port of the KVM Hypervisor for abstracting the software from the hardware, DTrace for troubleshooting and systems monitoring, and the ZFS file system to connect servers to storage systems. The company open-sourced SmartOS in August 2011.

Joyent took software that evolved over time in the running of their hosted business and licensed that software under the name Triton DataCenter (formerly "Triton Enterprise", "SDC" or "SmartDataCenter") to large hardware companies such as Dell.

== History ==
The name Joyent was coined by David Paul Young in the second half of 2004, and some early funding obtained from Peter Thiel. More funding was disclosed in July 2005 with Young as executive officer.

One of the early products was an online collaboration tool named Joyent Connector, an unusually large Ruby on Rails application, which was demonstrated at the Web 2.0 Conference in October 2005, launched in March 2006, open sourced in 2007, and discontinued in August 2011.

In November 2005, Joyent merged with TextDrive. Young became the chief executive of the merged company, while TextDrive CEO Dean Allen, a resident of France, became president and director of Joyent Europe.

Jason Hoffman (from TextDrive), serving as the merged company's chief technical officer, spearheaded the move from TextDrive's initial focus on application hosting to massively distributed systems, leading to a focus on cloud computing software and services to service providers. Allen left the company in 2007.

Young left the company in May 2012, and Hoffman took over as interim chief executive until the appointment of Henry Wasik in November 2012. Hoffman stepped down from his position as the company's chief technical officer in September 2013 and took a new position at Ericsson the next month. Bryan Cantrill was appointed CTO in his place in April 2014, with Mark Cavage assuming Cantrill's former VP engineering role.

The company has a history of acquisitions and divestments. In 2009, Joyent acquired Reasonably Smart, a cloud startup company with products based on JavaScript and Git. In 2009, it sold off both Strongspace and Bingodisk to ExpanDrive. In 2010, Joyent purchased LayerBoom, a Vancouver-based startup that provides software for managing virtual machines running on Windows and Linux.

On June 16, 2016, Samsung announced that it was acquiring Joyent.

On June 6, 2019, Joyent announced that their Triton public cloud would be shut down on November 9, 2019.

On April 11, 2022, Joyent announced that MNX Solutions would be taking over the Triton DataCenter technology suite.

As of 2025, Joyent is an internal organization of Samsung, and therefore no longer sells cloud or IT consulting services.

=== Financing ===
In 2004, TextDrive bootstrapped itself as a hosting company through crowd funding: customers were invited to invest money in exchange for free hosting for the lifetime of the company. TextDrive and, later, Joyent repeated the money-raising procedure a number of times in order to avoid the venture capital market and began to flounder, suffering from an absence of leadership and plagued by reliability issues, with users leaving for other hosts. Joyent raised venture capital for the first time in November 2009 from Intel and Dell. Joyent's early institutional investors include El Dorado Ventures, Epic Ventures, Intel Capital (series A, B Rounds), Greycroft Partners (Series A, B Rounds), Liberty Global (Series B Round). In January 2012, Joyent secured a new round of funding totalling $85 million from Weather Investment II, Accelero Capital, and Telefónica Digital. In October 2014, Joyent raised an additional $15 million in series D funding from existing investors.
