= Ports collection =

BSD-based package management

Ports collections (or ports trees, or just ports) are the sets of makefiles and patches provided by the BSD-based operating systems, FreeBSD, NetBSD, and OpenBSD, as a simple method of installing software or creating binary packages. They are usually the base of a package management system, with ports handling package creation and additional tools managing package removal, upgrade, and other tasks. In addition to the BSDs, a few Linux distributions have implemented similar infrastructure, including Gentoo's Portage, Arch's Arch Build System (ABS), CRUX's Ports and Void Linux's Templates.

The main advantage of the ports system when compared with a binary distribution model is that the installation can be tuned and optimized according to available resources. For example, the system administrator can easily install a 32 bit version of a package if the 64 bit version is not available or is not optimized for that machine. Conversely, the main disadvantage is compilation time, which can be significant. For example, a full installation of a FreeBSD system, using ports, can take several days, depending on the hardware.

== FreeBSD Ports ==
Jordan Hubbard committed his port make macros to the FreeBSD CVS repository on August 21, 1994. His package install suite Makefile had been committed a year earlier (August 26, 1993). The core ports framework was at first maintained by Hubbard along with Satoshi Asami for several years. The Ports Management Team was later formed to handle this task.

== NetBSD's pkgsrc ==
NetBSD's pkgsrc ports collection is distinctive in that it aims to be portable and is usable on a number of operating systems aside from NetBSD itself, including the other BSDs, SmartOS/illumos, macOS, MINIX 3, Linux and other Unix-likes. pkgsrc was created in August 1997 based on the existing FreeBSD ports system. It follows a quarterly release schedule and as of October 2018 contains over 22'000 packages. With their 1.4 release, DragonFly BSD announced that they would be adopting pkgsrc as their official package management system. DragonFly BSD however built their own ports implementation called dports with the release 3.4 and switched over to it completely with 3.6. The development is done via their git.

== OpenBSD ports ==
In contrast to FreeBSD Ports, on which it was originally based, the OpenBSD ports system is intended as a source used to create the end product, packages: installing a port first creates a package and then installs it. Ports are made up of a makefile, text files with descriptions and installation messages, any patches required to adjust the program to work on OpenBSD and a packing list listing the files to be included in the packages. The ports tree uses a set of standard makefiles, some of which are shared with the source tree, to provide the bulk of its functionality; this shared infrastructure includes many utility functions for port developers and means that ports can often be made very simply.

In late October 2007, OpenBSD developer Nikolay Sturm announced that -stable ports tree should be considered unmaintained due to the lack of resources. This effectively forced users to run -current ports/base tree in order to keep up with security updates. In 2009, it was decided to revive the -stable ports tree under supervision of Robert Nagy and Jasper Lievisse Adriaanse.

There are three unofficial web sites with a listing of OpenBSD ports and packages:

- openports.pl
- OpenPorts.se, originally announced as ports.openbsd.nu in 2006, was a custom-written web-site that does its own parsing of the ports tree structure and the updates, and has the functionality of tracking changes of a given port, having a shortcoming of not supporting some of the more complicated Makefile logic, and thus missing some 15% of packages that require the intricate knowledge of the ports tree structure and the use of the official tools. The project was discontinued in January 2023.
- ports.su, announced in February 2013 and is based on the official sqlports database, thus having a complete collection of all the packages and flavours that are available for the amd64 platform. Being based on the official tools, the "virtual" (non-primary) categories are readily available, and so is the information about the library, build and run-time dependencies. The source of the web-site is heavily based on the ports-readmes port, and is readily available in GitHub. The project is no longer updated since November 2018.

== See also ==
- Android Runtime which does ahead-of-time compilation at installation
- MacPorts, used in macOS. The name and design is based on the ports system
- Portage (software), used in Gentoo Linux and inspired by the ports system
