= Dean Allen =

Canadian typographer, web developer and blogger

Dean Cameron Allen (June 2, 1966 – January 13, 2018) was a Canadian typographer, web developer and early blogger. He created the markup language Textile, the open source content management system Textpattern, and the web hosting service TextDrive. Alec Kinnear of Foliovision called Textile "the world's greatest markup language" and said it was used in 37signals § Basecamp.

Allen was an early blogger and essayist in the late 1990s at his sites Cardigan Industries and Textism. He created Textile so that writers could "...Just Write and everything else should be there to support that endeavour."
