= Sonatype Nexus Repository =

Software repository manager

- Developer: Sonatype Inc.
- Stable release: 3.87.1-01
- Repository: github.com/sonatype/nexus-public
- Written in: Java
- Type: Software repository manager
- License: Eclipse Public License or proprietary
- Website: sonatype.com

Sonatype Nexus Repository is a software repository manager, available under both an open-source license and a proprietary license. It can combine repositories for various programming languages, so that a single server can be used as a source for building software. The open source version uses the H2 database.

Alternatives to Nexus include JFrog Artifactory.

== History ==
Tamás Cservenák originally developed Proximity in 2005, because he had a slow ADSL internet connection. He was later hired by Sonatype to build a similar product, Nexus.
