= OpenCSW =

- Formation: 2008; 18 years ago
- Type: Association
- Headquarters: Greifensee, Zurich, Switzerland
- Official language: English
- President: Peter Felecan
- Main organ: Project Board
- Website: www.opencsw.org

The Open Community Software Project (OpenCSW) is an open-source project providing Solaris binary packages of freely available or open-source software.

It is an Association in terms of Article 60-79 of the Swiss Civil Code with domicile in Greifensee/ZH, Switzerland. The purpose of the association is to provide software packages that run on currently supported production versions of the Solaris Operating Environment. It was founded as a fork by former members of the "CSW" packaging project, previously hosted at Blastwave. The Blastwave project is now defunct.

OpenCSW provides packages for Solaris 9, 10, and 11 (by compatible Solaris 10 packages) for 32 and 64-bit, x86 and SPARC architectures. Solaris 8 is no longer a first-class supported OS, however, there still exists a legacy Solaris 8 archive.

== Technical details ==
OpenCSW package repositories are compatible with pkgutil, a package installation utility, as well as the original pkg-get utility. The utility automatically handles package dependency resolution and downloads package files from mirrors, simplifying package installation.

Most new packages are being built using GAR, a framework written primarily in GNU make, which automates large parts of Solaris package creation.

OpenCSW smoothly integrates SVR4 style packages into Solaris. Unlike some sites, it uses SVR4 "Class Action Scripts", which standardize common pkgadd-type operations, eliminating the need for security prompting about most per-class custom install scripts.

With the disappearance of Blastwave and the removal of free downloads of SunFreeware on 30 September 2013, OpenCSW is the biggest source of Solaris packages. As of 14 August 2014, it had 3739 unique packages for Solaris 10.

== See also ==
- Blastwave — a project from which OpenCSW was forked
