= Jordan Hubbard =

American open-source software developer

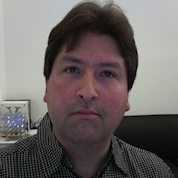
- Hubbard in 2010
- Born: April 8, 1963 (age 63); Honolulu, Hawaii, U.S.
- Occupations: Sr Director, NVIDIA
- Known for: FreeBSD, NextBSD, FreeNAS Corral

Jordan K. Hubbard (born April 8, 1963) is an American open source software developer, authoring software such as the Ardent Window Manager and various other open source tools and libraries before co-founding the FreeBSD project with Nate Williams and Rodney W. Grimes in 1993, for which he contributed the initial FreeBSD Ports collection, package management system and sysinstall. In July 2001 Hubbard joined Apple Computer in the role of manager of the BSD technology group, during which time he was one of the creators of MacPorts. In 2005, his title was "Director of UNIX Technology" and in October 2007, Hubbard was promoted to "Director of Engineering of Unix Technologies" at Apple where he remained until June 2013.

On July 15, 2013, he became CTO of iXsystems where he also led the FreeNAS open source project.

On March 24, 2017, he announced his plan to depart from iXsystems and that he would be joining TwoPoreGuys, a Biotechnology company, as VP of Engineering. From January 2019–April 2020 he was part of the Engineering Leadership team at Uber and, as of April 2020, is currently Senior Director for GPU Compute Software at Nvidia.

== rwall incident ==
On March 31, 1987, Hubbard executed an rwall command expecting it to send a message to every machine on the network at University of California, Berkeley, where he headed the Distributed Unix Group. The command instead began broadcasting Hubbard's message to every machine on the internet and was stopped after Hubbard realised the message was being broadcast remotely after he received complaints from people at Purdue University and University of Texas. Even though the command was terminated, it resulted in Hubbard receiving 743 messages and complaints.
