= Paldo (operating system) =

Linux distribution

paldo
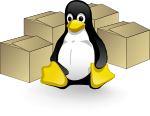
- OS family: Unix-like (Linux kernel)
- Working state: Current
- Source model: Open source
- Initial release: October 31, 2004; 22 years ago
- Latest release: rolling release "2205" (image version)
- Update method: Upkg
- Supported platforms: IA-32, x86-64
- Kernel type: Monolithic
- Userland: GNU
- Default user interface: GNOME
- License: Mainly the GNU GPL plus proprietary binary blobs and various other licenses
- Official website: www.paldo.org

paldo ("pure adaptable linux distribution") is a Linux distribution. It was originally developed by Jürg Billeter and Raffaele Sandrini and released in 2004, mainly under the GNU GPL.

== Overview ==
paldo was developed primarily for desktop computers using the IA-32 (i686) and x86-64 architectures to utilize applications that remain as close to their upstream source as possible. It has a history of frequent stable releases starting in 2004 (generally every 3 months) and a "rolling release" style of continual updating of the system and application packages. Paldo has typically been offered in stable and unstable versions and is one of the relatively few independent distributions listed on DistroWatch.

A stated intent of the paldo project is to only use selected programs in the distribution that satisfy a "just works" principle, with limited intervention needed by the user to compile or update, and minimal duplication of applications designed to accomplish the same task. Another principle is to minimize patching of paldo application packages, preserving adaptability for the end user to make changes or customize the system. Minimal customization of applications may also allow any required patches to be more easily available to the maintainers of the original packages. A customized installer application was developed, however, to simplify installation of live CD releases to the user's computer.

In 2009, the version 7 release of the Swedish-based ExTiX Linux distribution was based on Paldo version 1.18(stable), using Linux kernel 2.6.30 and Gnome desktop environment 2.26.1.

In 2016, Jesse Smith reviewed Paldo GNU/Linux 2015 in DistroWatch Weekly:

paldo is a Upkg driven GNU/Linux distribution. It's kind of a mix of a source and a binary distribution. Even though it builds packages like a source distribution it provides binary packages. paldo wants to be a distribution according to the "just-works" principle. It tries to configure automatically as much as possible without user intervention. paldo is task-oriented, means, that we won't provide several programs to do one and the same task, we will select the program which we think does this task best, and include it into paldo. paldo aims to support cutting-edge technologies.

Around April of every year they announce the following major software updates which are GNOME, LibreOffice, Firefox, Linux, glibc and gcc.

== Featured Applications ==
paldo has primarily used the GNOME desktop in release snapshots available on the Live/Install CD. The default web browser is Epiphany, the default browser for the GNOME desktop environment, although other browsers are available or can be built using the native Upkg package manager.

Typical applications found on the paldo Live/Install CD and in the repository have included:

- Epiphany
- Tomboy
- LibreOffice
- GNOME Videos
- Pidgin
- GNOME Text Editor

Subsequent to the 1.22 stable release, paldo adopted a rolling release format and by April 2011 paldo stable included GNOME 3.0, the Linux 2.6.38.3 kernel, and had already moved to systemd, a few weeks earlier than Fedora.

== Package management system ==
paldo uses the Upkg package manager to update/upgrade the system and to install applications. Upkg was uniquely developed for the paldo project and is responsible for the distribution's character as a mixed source and binary based operating system. Written in C#, Upkg uses the Mono runtime to build packages from source, or to install pre-built binaries, using XML specifications that can be customized by the user. It relies on the command-line interface rather than a graphics-based user interface implementation commonly found in many desktop-oriented Linux distributions. Upkg provides dependency resolution, package indexing and automatic menu additions, although its processing time to upgrade the system and install packages, even those available through the online paldo repository, has been found to be relatively long.
