= SPARC64 =

SPARC64 or sparc64 may refer to:

- sparc64, an alternative name used by free software projects for the SPARC V9 instruction set architecture
- SPARC64 V series by Fujitsu
- HAL SPARC64, a microprocessor designed by HAL Computer Systems
