= Textpattern =

Open source content management system written in PHP

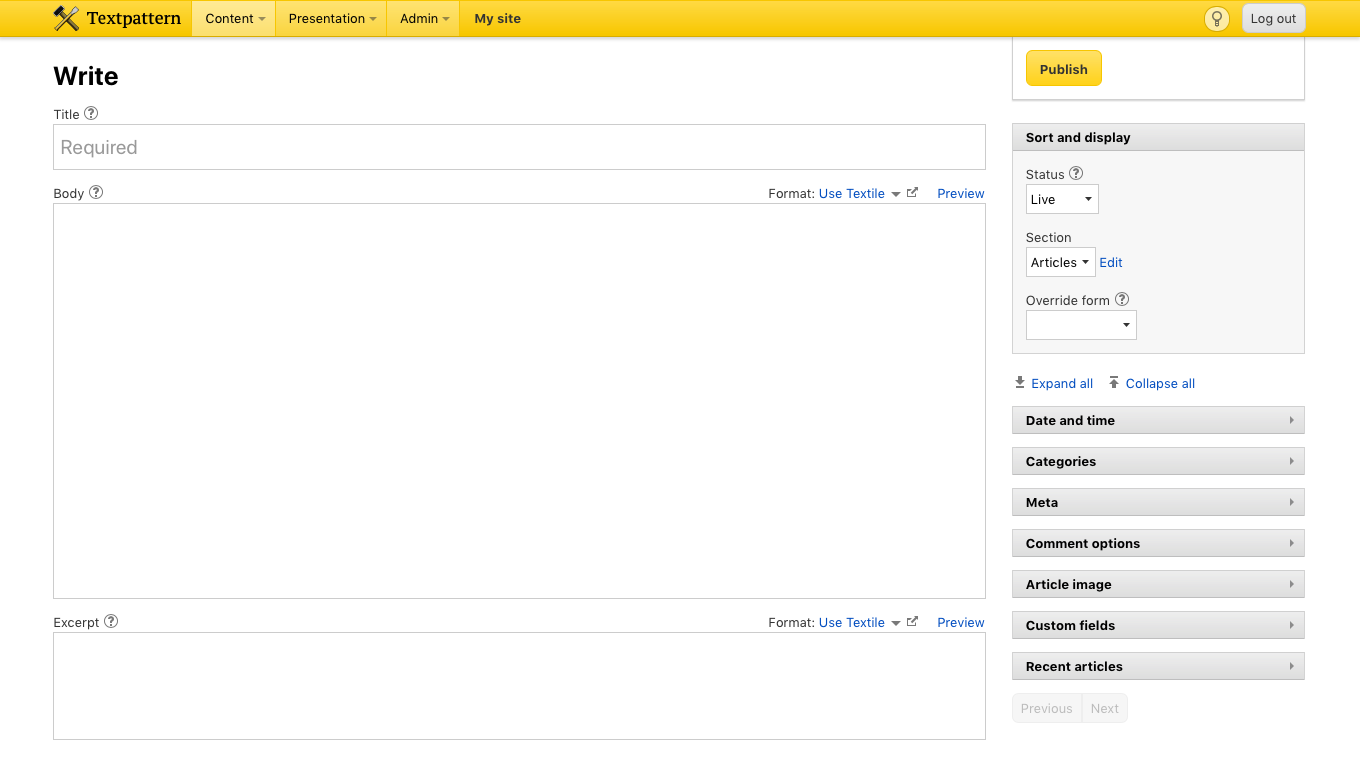
- Textpattern CMS admin panel
- Original author: Dean Allen
- Developer: Team Textpattern
- Release: March 19, 2003; 23 years ago
- Stable release: 4.9.2 / 2026-11-02[±]
- Written in: PHP
- Operating system: Unix-like, Windows, Linux
- Available in: 54 languages
- Type: Blog software, Content Management System, Content Management Framework
- License: GNU GPLv2
- Website: textpattern.com
- Repository: github.com/textpattern/textpattern

Textpattern is a free and open-source content management system (CMS) for PHP and MySQL. It was originally developed by Dean Allen and now developed by Team Textpattern. While it is typically listed among weblogging tools, its aim is to be a general-purpose content management system. The current stable version is Textpattern 4.9.2.

== History ==
Textpattern grew out of the system used to publish Textism, Allen's personal site, and an unnamed version was announced as available to alpha testers in 2001. In 2003, Textpattern was formally announced. The early alpha versions were followed by a series of beta releases which saw more widespread use, and which were themselves superseded by a series of "gamma" releases which expanded and refined Textpattern's capabilities. Since the final gamma version (1.19), Textpattern has been distributed under the GNU General Public License.

The next version, in September 2004, was Release Candidate 1 for Textpattern 1.0. In a somewhat unorthodox move, Textpattern continued to accumulate features as the second, third, fourth and fifth release candidates were made public. During this time the development team expanded to include several contributors from the Textpattern community. Alex Shiels and Pedro Palazón joined the development team, and Sencer Yurdagül was assigned as Textpattern's release manager.

Due to a development process that extended much longer than originally envisioned, the first stable release of Textpattern was version 4.0 on August 14, 2005.

== Release history ==
The 4.2.0 release ("Textpattern CMS 4.2.0 released".), which was the next major release following 4.0.8, in September 2009 was a major update. The most notable new features were administrative-side enhancements and hooks for creating administrative plugins and themes.

The 4.3.0 release ("Textpattern CMS 4.3.0 released".) in November 2010 introduced new features and improvements, notably more advanced image handling, and administrative updates in preparation for modernising and streamlining the core code.

The 4.5.0 release ("Textpattern CMS 4.5.0 released: a hive of activity".) in August 2012 brought many improvements, including a new HTML5 public theme and extensive modernisation of the administration area of the system.

The 4.6.0 release ("Textpattern CMS 4.6.0 released: it's big".) in September 2016 is one of the most significant releases to-date. Two years in the making, the update from v4.5.7 to v4.6.0 saw almost as many new commits to the code base as there had been in the entire previous project. The result was modernized code, an improved parser, and many new features.

The 4.7.0 release ("Textpattern CMS 4.7.0 released: theme support as standard".) in May 2018 added support for themes, which had been one of the noted deficiencies of the platform compared to other software. This release was dedicated in honor of creator Dean Allen who died in January 2018.

The 4.8.0 release ("Textpattern CMS 4.8.0 released".) in February 2020 contained over 800 changes to Textpattern's code to add new functionality, enhance existing features, resolve some issues from previous Textpattern releases and lay more foundations for extending the capabilities of Textpattern in future.

== Developers ==
All of the original developers have departed the project: Allen and Palazón in 2006, Shiels in 2007, and Yurdagül in 2009. As of March 2022, the current developers are Stef Dawson, Phil Wareham, Pete Cooper, and Oleg Loukianov.

== Features ==
Textpattern offers a number of features and conveniences to designers, users, site administrators and developers, including:

- Ease of publishing using Textile, a text-to-HTML converter which permits users to publish content without learning HTML.
- Preview of both the final "look" of content and of its HTML.
- Theme templates that permit both live and in-development layouts to operate side-by-side using the same live data. Development templates can be previewed and made live instantly without need for a staging environment.
- A tag-based template system which allows the creation of reusable blocks of content and code, referred to as "forms", and a built-in "tag builder" to automate their creation.
- Tags can be used as values of other tags' attributes ("tags in tags").
- Tags can be used to set up variables in order to verify whether certain conditions are met.
- A privilege-based user hierarchy, allowing for an organized structure of writers, editors and publishers to aid collaboration and content publishing workflows.
- A commenting system, including measures to combat spam.
- Syndication of site content via RSS and Atom.
- A robust plugin architecture which allows the addition of features to any part of the system, including the administrative backend.
- An integrated link management system.
- An integrated image management system which allows the association of images with particular pieces of content.
- An integrated file management system which allows files to be offered for download.
- Separation of content from presentation with a concept of "sections" defined for presentation and "categories" for content organization.
- An arbitrary number of custom data fields per article.
- UTF-8 publishing and support for many languages, including English, French, Italian, German, Czech, Japanese, Estonian, Latvian, Dutch, Norwegian, Danish, Portuguese, Catalan, Polish, Slovenian, Indonesian, Swedish, Icelandic, Russian, Arabic, Persian, and Greek (including support for polytonic).

== See also ==
- Comparison of content management systems
- Comparison of lightweight markup languages
- Textile — lightweight rich text markup language and text-to-HTML converter.
