= OpenPKG =

Open source package management system for Unix

OpenPKG is an open source package management system for Unix. It is based on the well known RPM-system and allows easy and unified installation of packages onto common Unix-platforms (Solaris, Linux and FreeBSD).

The project was launched by Ralf S. Engelschall in November 2000 and in June 2005 it offered more than 880 freely available packages.
