= Textile (markup language) =

Lightweight markup language

- Filename extensions: .textile
- Developed by: Dean Allen
- Initial release: December 26, 2002; 23 years ago
- Latest release: 4.1.0 (PHP); January 2, 2024; 2 years ago
- Type of format: Markup language
- Open format?: yes
- Website: textile-lang.com

Textile is a lightweight markup language that uses a text formatting syntax to convert plain text into structured HTML markup. Textile is used for writing articles, forum posts, readme documentation, and any other type of written content published online.

== History ==
Textile was developed by Dean Allen in 2002, which he billed as "a humane web text generator" that enabled you to "simply write". Dean created Textile for use in Textpattern, the CMS he also developed about the same time.

Textile is one of several lightweight markup languages to have influenced the development of Markdown.

== Doctype support ==
Text marked-up with Textile converts into valid HTML when rendered in a web browser, and though it probably varies from one implementation type to another, an installation of Textile can be set for a Doctype Declaration of XHTML or HTML5, with XHTML being the default for backward compatibility.

In the PHP implementation, for example, when using Textile's all-caps abbreviation syntax – AGE(A Given Example) – the result will render as an abbr element in HTML5 and as an acronym element in XHTML. Likewise, as of PHP version 3.5, if you use alignment markers in Textile's image syntax, HTML5 will get extra classes on the rendered img element, while XHTML remains with the align attribute.

== Syntax usage ==
Various resources are available for learning and using Textile:

- TxStyle – a help site for the PHP implementation of Textile, and provides a converter. This site is currently used by the Textpattern CMS project.
- Textile Reference Site for RedCloth – a help site for the Ruby implementation of Textile.
- Textile Syntax: Eclipse – a reference site for the Java implementation of Textile that's now merged with Mylin WikiText.
- Textile 2 Syntax – MovableType's Textile authoring documentation.
- Textile Cheatsheet – a basic quick-reference sheet from Warped Visions.

In addition to its suite of syntax usage, Textile automatically inserts character entity references for apostrophes, opening and closing single and double quotation marks, ellipses and em dashes, to name a few.

== Licensing ==
Textile is distributed under a BSD-style license and is included with, or available as a plugin for, several content-management systems.

== Software and services ==
Various projects use (or have used) Textile:

- Basecamp Classic – the original Basecamp project management software from 37signals used Textile
- Assembla
- Atlassian (JIRA)
- Guild Wars 2 official forums
- Jekyll (software)
- Know Your Meme
- OpenProject
- Qt official forums
- Redmine
- Salesforce.com – uses Textile in its Desk.com product
- SUSE Studio
- Textile Note – a text application for iOS, Android, and Windows that supports Textile
- Textile Wiki
- Textpattern
- WriteMonkey – a distraction-free desktop text editor for Windows; supports various markup languages, including Textile
- WiGit – a Git-based Wiki

== See also ==
- Comparison of document markup languages
- Comparison of notetaking software
- Comparison of documentation generators
