= Illumos =

Free software operating system based on Solaris

- Developer: Illumos Foundation
- Written in: C
- OS family: Unix (SVR4)
- Working state: Current
- Source model: Open source with binary blobs
- Initial release: 2010; 16 years ago
- Repository: code.illumos.org
- Available in: English
- Supported platforms: x86-64, SPARC64, ARM (under development), DEC Alpha
- Kernel type: Monolithic
- License: CDDL, BSD, MIT
- Preceded by: OpenSolaris
- Official website: illumos.org

Illumos (stylized as "illumos") is a partly free and open-source Unix operating system. It has been developed since 2010 and is based on OpenSolaris, after the discontinuation of that product by Oracle. It comprises a kernel, device drivers, system libraries, and utility software for system administration. Its core has become the base for many different open-sourced Illumos distributions, in a way similar to how the Linux kernel is used in different Linux distributions.

== Name ==
The maintainers write illumos in lowercase, since some computer fonts do not clearly distinguish a lowercase L from an uppercase i: Il (see homoglyph). The project name is a combination of words illuminare from the Latin for to light, and OS for Operating System.

== History and development ==
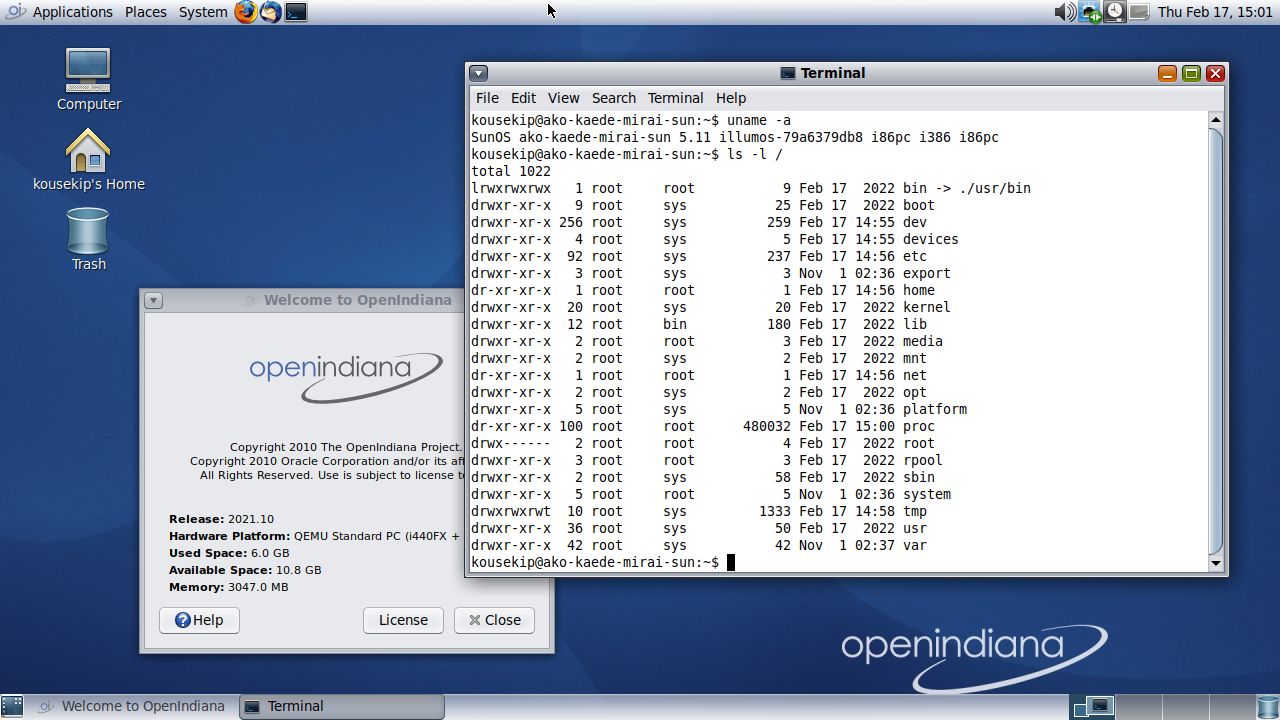
The OpenIndiana operating system is one of many Illumos distributions.

Illumos was announced via webinar on 3 August 2010, as a community effort of a group of core Solaris engineers to create a truly open source Solaris, by swapping closed source bits of OpenSolaris with open implementations. OpenSolaris itself is based on System V Release 4 (SVR4) and the Berkeley Software Distribution (BSD).

The original plan explicitly stated that Illumos would not be a distribution or a fork. However, after Oracle announced the discontinuation of OpenSolaris, plans were made to fork the final version of the Solaris ON kernel, (Note: The "OS/Network" consolidation (project), considered the heart of the Solaris kernel) allowing Illumos to evolve into a kernel of its own. As of 2010, efforts focused on libc, the NFS lock manager, the crypto module, and many device drivers, to create a Solaris-like OS with no closed, proprietary code. By 2012, development emphasis included transitioning from the historical compiler, Studio, to GCC. The "userland" software started to be built with GNU make, and many GNU utilities such as GNU tar were included. During this time, Illumos was lightly led by founder Garrett D'Amore and other community members/developers such as Bryan Cantrill and Adam Leventhal, via a Developers' Council.

As of 2019 its primary development project, illumos-gate, derives from OS/Net (aka ON), which is a Solaris kernel with the bulk of the drivers, core libraries, and basic utilities, similar to what is delivered by a BSD "src" tree. It was originally dependent on OpenSolaris OS/Net, but a fork was made after Oracle silently decided to close the development of Solaris and unofficially killed the OpenSolaris project.

== Features ==
- ZFS, a combined file system with integrated logical volume management, providing a high level of data integrity for very large storage capacities.
- Solaris Containers (or Zones), a low overhead implementation of operating system-level virtualization technology for x86 and SPARC systems.
- DTrace, a comprehensive dynamic tracing framework for troubleshooting kernel and application problems on production systems in real time.
- Kernel-based Virtual Machine (KVM), a virtualization infrastructure. KVM supports native virtualization on processors with hardware virtualization extensions.
- OpenSolaris Network Virtualization and Resource Control (or Crossbow), a set of features that provides an internal network virtualization and quality of service including: virtual NIC (VNIC) pseudo-network interface technology, exclusive ip zones, bandwidth management, and flow control on a per interface and per VNIC basis.

== Distributions ==
Distributions, at illumos.org

- DilOS, with Debian package manager (dpkg + apt) and virtualization support, available for x86-64 and SPARC.
- NexentaStor, distribution optimized for virtualization, storage area networks, network-attached storage, and iSCSI or Fibre Channel applications employing the ZFS file system.
- OmniOS Community Edition, takes a minimalist approach suitable for server use.
- OpenIndiana, a distribution that is a continuation and fork in the spirit of the OpenSolaris operating system.
- SmartOS, a distribution for hypervisor use and cloud computing with Kernel-based Virtual Machine , Bhyve HVM integration with LX zones (Linux compatible).
- Helios, a distribution powering the Oxide Computer Rack.
- Tribblix, retro style distribution with modern components, available for x86-64 and SPARC.
- v9os, a server-only, IPS-based minimal SPARC distribution.
- XStreamOS, a distribution for infrastructure, cloud, and web development.

Discontinued:

- Dyson, derived from Debian using libc, and SMF init system.
- OpenSXCE, distribution for developers and system administrators for IA-32/x86-64 x86 platforms and SPARC.

== Illumos Foundation ==
The Illumos Foundation was incorporated in the State of California in 2012 as a 501(c)6 trade association, with founding board members Jason Hoffman (formerly at Joyent), Evan Powell (Nexenta), and Garrett D'Amore.

As of 2024, its status in California is "dissolved".
