= Pkgsrc =

Package manager for Unix-like operating systems

pkgsrc
- Developers: Alistair Crooks, Hubert Feyrer and Johnny C. Lam
- Release: January 4, 1998; 28 years ago
- Stable release: 2026Q2 / 23 June 2026; 2 months ago
- Written in: C, Unix shell
- Operating system: Unix-like
- Type: Package management system
- License: BSD License
- Website: www.pkgsrc.org
- Repository: github.com/NetBSD/pkgsrc.git

pkgsrc (package source) is a package management system for Unix-like operating systems. It was forked from the FreeBSD ports collection in 1997 as the primary package management system for NetBSD. Since then it has evolved independently; in 1999, support for Solaris was added, followed by support for other operating systems.

As of September 2025, pkgsrc currently contains over 29,000 packages and includes most popular open-source software. It is the native package manager on NetBSD, SmartOS and MINIX 3, and is portable across 23 different operating systems, including AIX, various BSD derivatives, HP-UX, IRIX, Linux, macOS, Solaris, and QNX.

There are multiple ways to install programs using pkgsrc. The pkgsrc bootstrap contains a traditional ports collection that utilizes a series of makefiles to compile software from source. Another method is to install pre-built binary packages via the pkg_add and pkg_delete tools. A high-level utility named pkgin also exists, and is designed to automate the installation, removal, and update of binary packages in a manner similar to Debian's Advanced Packaging Tool.

== Supported platforms ==
Platform	Date added
NetBSD	October 1997
Solaris	March 1999
Linux	June 1999
Darwin and macOS	October 2001
FreeBSD	November 2002
OpenBSD	November 2002
IRIX	December 2002
BSD/OS	December 2003
AIX	December 2003
Interix (for Windows NT)	March 2004
DragonFly BSD	October 2004
OSF/1	November 2004
HP-UX	April 2007
QNX	October 2007
Haiku	January 2010
MINIX 3	August 2010
MirBSD	January 2011
illumos and SmartOS	February 2011
Cygwin	May 2013
GNU/kFreeBSD	July 2013
Bitrig	June 2015

== History ==
On October 3, 1997, NetBSD developers Alistair Crooks and Hubert Feyrer created pkgsrc based on the FreeBSD ports system and intended to support the NetBSD packages collection. It was officially released as part of NetBSD 1.3 on January 4, 1998. DragonFly BSD used pkgsrc as its official package system from version 1.4 in 2006, to 3.4 in 2013.

On 2017-09-12, a commit message policy that accommodates DVCS was established by the project.

== Packages ==
The NetBSD Foundation provides official, pre-built binary packages for multiple combinations of NetBSD and pkgsrc releases, and occasionally for certain other operating systems as well.

As of 2018, several vendors provide pre-built binary packages for several platforms:

- Since at least 2014, Joyent has provided binary packages for SmartOS/illumos, macOS, and Enterprise Linux (CentOS/Oracle/Red Hat/Scientific). Packages are provided on a rolling release basis from the trunk (HEAD, in CVS terminology) of pkgsrc, with updates every few days; additionally, quarterly stable releases of pkgsrc for Joyent's own SmartOS are also provided (dating back to 2012Q4).
- Since 2017, University of Wisconsin–Milwaukee has provided binary packages for NetBSD, RHEL/CentOS, and Darwin/macOS. Packages are only built from the quarterly releases of pkgsrc, aiding use in long-term experiments, where stability and reproducibility of the findings is of the essence.
