= FreeBSD Ports =

FreeBSD package management system

The FreeBSD Ports collection is a package management system for the FreeBSD operating system. Ports in the collection vary with contributed software. There were 38,487 ports available in February 2020 and 36,504 in September 2024. It has also been adopted by NetBSD as the basis of its pkgsrc system.

== Installing from source ==
The ports collection uses Makefiles arranged in a directory hierarchy so that software can be built, installed and uninstalled with the make command. When installing an application, very little (if any) user intervention is required after issuing a beginning command such as make install or make install clean in the ports directory of the desired application. In most cases the software is automatically downloaded from the Internet, patched and configured if necessary, then compiled, installed and registered in the package database. If the new port has needed dependencies on other applications or libraries, these are installed beforehand automatically.

Most ports are already configured with default options which have been deemed generally appropriate for most users. However, these configuration options (called knobs) can sometimes be changed before installation using the make config command, which brings up a text-based interface that allows the user to select the desired options.

Historically, each port (or software package) has been maintained by an individual port maintainer who is responsible for ensuring the currency of the port and providing general support. Today, many ports are maintained by special task forces or sub-projects, each with a dedicated mailing list (e.g. kde@FreeBSD.org, java@FreeBSD.org, etc.), while unmaintained ports are assigned to the generic group ports@FreeBSD.org. In general, anyone may become a port maintainer by contributing their favorite software to the collection. One may also choose to maintain an existing port with no active maintainer.

== Packages ==
Precompiled (binary) ports are called packages. A package can be created from the corresponding port with the make package command; pre-built packages are also available for download from FreeBSD-hosted package repositories. A user can install a package by passing the package name to the pkg install command. This downloads the appropriate package for the installed FreeBSD release version, then installs the application, including any software dependencies it may have. By default, packages are downloaded from the main FreeBSD Package Repository (pkg.freebsd.org), but if there are any troubles after updating packages, previous version of packages cannot be installed because the repository denies subfolders indexes. In this case, a user must upgrade the OS version to the latest release and install latest packages.

FreeBSD maintains a build farm called the pointyhat cluster in which all packages for all supported architectures and major releases are built. The build logs and known errors for all ports built into packages through the pointyhat cluster are available in a database and weekly builds logs are also available through mailing list archives.

These pre-compiled packages are separated into categories by the architectures for which they are available. Packages are further separated into several "release" directories, one for each current production release built from the ports collection and shipped with the release. These production release directories are never updated.

There are also stable and current directories for several major release branches. These are updated more or less weekly. In most cases a package created for an older version of FreeBSD can be installed and used on a newer system without difficulty since binary backward compatibility across major releases is enabled by default.

A packaging system for binary packages called pkg has replaced the package management system in FreeBSD 10.

== History ==
Jordan Hubbard committed his port make macros to the FreeBSD CVS repository on August 21, 1994. His package install suite Makefile had been committed a year earlier (August 26, 1993). The core ports framework was at first maintained by Hubbard along with Satoshi Asami for several years. The Ports Management Team was later formed to handle this task.

NetBSD's pkgsrc and OpenBSD's ports collection trace their roots to FreeBSD.

== DPorts ==
Since its release, 3.6 DragonFly BSD project uses FreeBSD Ports as a base for its own DPorts ports collection. John Marino of DragonFly BSD project created DeltaPorts repository – a collection of patches and files that overlay and modify the FreeBSD Ports, in order to generate DPorts.

== See also ==
- MacPorts
- Portage – Gentoo's package management system, originally modeled on FreeBSD Ports
- Arch Build System – Arch Linux's ports-like system for building packages from source
- List of software package management systems
