= St. Mark's Episcopal Church (Glendale, California) =

Church in California, United States

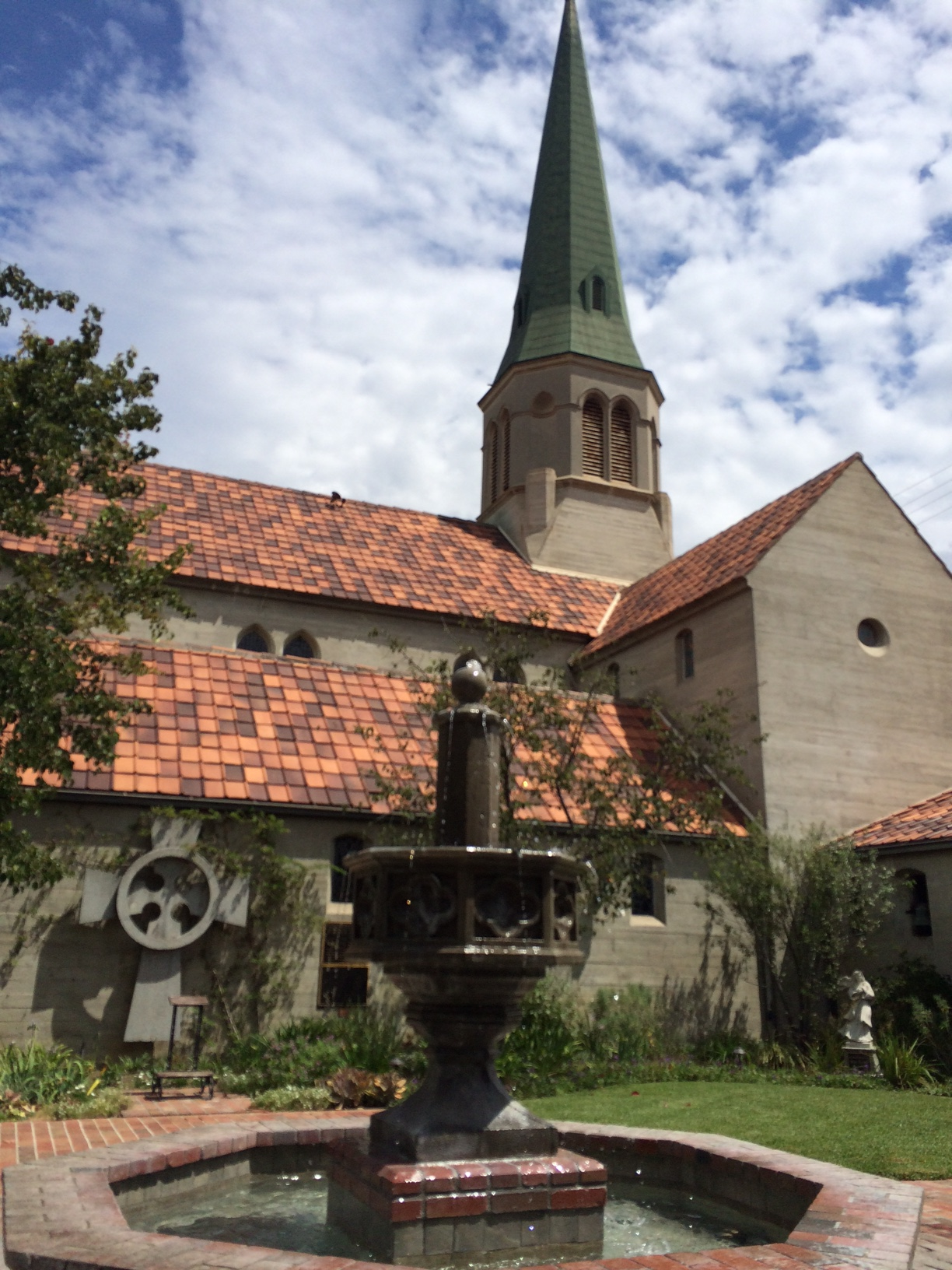
- A view of St. Mark's Episcopal Church from the courtyard.

Religion
- Affiliation: Episcopal Church
- Leadership: The Very Rev'd. Canon Mark A. Weitzel
- Year consecrated: 1893
- Status: Active

Location
- Location: Glendale, California
- Interactive map of St. Mark's Episcopal Church
- Coordinates: 34°09′40.6″N 118°15′15.7″W

Architecture
- Architect: Carleton M. Winslow
- Style: Romanesque Revival
- Completed: 1948

Specifications
- Direction of façade: west
- Materials: concrete, stucco

St. Mark's Episcopal Church is a parish of the Episcopal Church in Glendale, California, founded in 1893. Records indicate that the first services occurred in August 1888, predating its official founding by five years.

The historic church is located at 1020 North Brand Boulevard in the center of Glendale. The rector is the Very Reverend Canon Mark A. Weitzel. This church has been a popular venue for many concerts and stage productions.

In 2009, the church acquired, with help from the Ahmanson Foundation, a very high quality pipe organ built in 1929 by Ernest M. Skinner (Opus 774). The church also runs a preschool and pre-Kindergarten program for children between the ages of two and five. In 2013, a book was published which details the history of the parish. Thomas Bushnell, BSG, notable founder of the GNU Hurd, is a member of St. Mark's.

== See also ==
- Anglicanism
- Christianity
- Los Angeles
