= PacBSD =

Operating system

- OS family: UNIX
- Working state: Discontinued
- Source model: Open source
- Latest release: (Rolling release) / August 14, 2017; 9 years ago
- Marketing target: General purpose
- Update method: pacman
- Package manager: pacman
- Supported platforms: x86-64
- Kernel type: Monolithic with dynamically loadable modules
- Userland: GNU
- Default user interface: Command-line interface
- License: Free software (FreeBSD License, FreeBSD Documentation License)
- Official website: pacbsd.org at the Wayback Machine (archived December 18, 2023)

PacBSD (formerly known as Arch BSD) was an operating system based on Arch Linux, but used the FreeBSD kernel instead of the Linux kernel and the GNU userland. The PacBSD project began on an Arch Linux forum thread in April 2012. It aimed to provide an Arch-like user environment, utilizing the OpenRC init system, the pacman package manager, and rolling-release.

== See also ==
- Arch Hurd: A similar project with GNU/Hurd as its base
- Arch Linux
- FreeBSD
- GNU variants
