= Arch Linux =

Rolling release Linux distribution

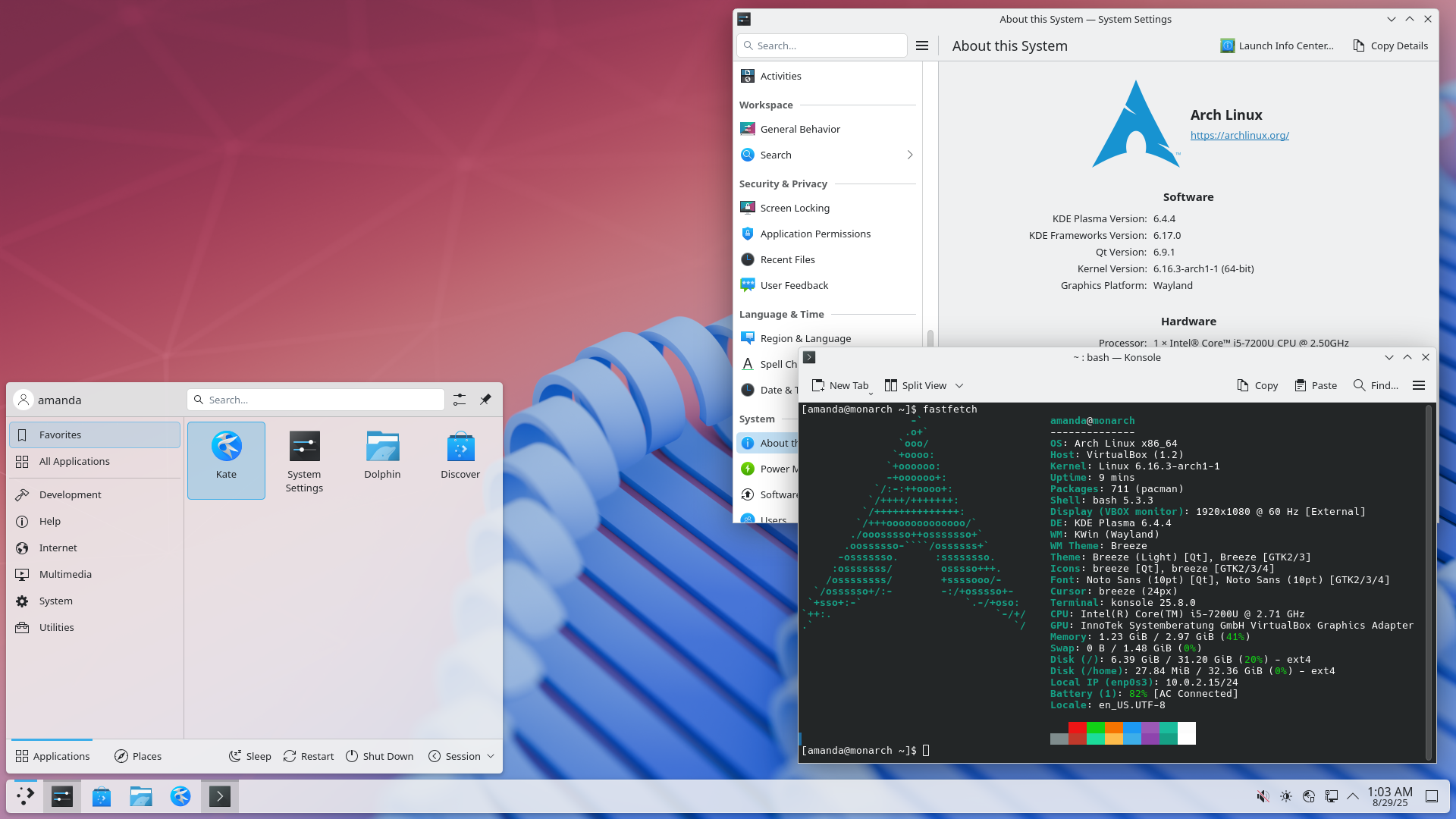
- Arch Linux using the KDE Plasma 6 desktop environment
- Developer: Levente Polyak (lead developer)
- OS family: Linux (Unix-like)
- Working state: Current
- Source model: Open-source
- Initial release: 11 March 2002; 24 years ago
- Repository: gitlab.archlinux.org www.github.com/archlinux
- Marketing target: General purpose
- Update method: pacman (Note: Pacman is the official way to update Arch Linux. AUR Helpers and graphical app stores, such as Discover and GNOME Software, are available.)
- Package manager: pacman, libalpm (back-end)
- Supported platforms: x86-64 Unofficial: i686 (Note: Maintained by the Arch Linux 32 project. Formerly official until November 2017.); ARM (armhf and AArch64) (Note: Maintained by the Arch Linux ARM project.); LoongArch (Note: Maintained by the Loong Arch Linux project.); PowerPC (Note: Maintained by the ArchPOWER project.); RISC-V (Note: Maintained by the Arch Linux RISC-V project.)
- Kernel type: Monolithic (Linux kernel)
- Userland: GNU
- Influenced: SteamOS, Artix Linux, EndeavourOS, Manjaro, CachyOS, Garuda Linux and others
- Influenced by: CRUX, BSD
- Default user interface: Command-line interface (Zsh as the default shell in Live CD or Live USB and Bash as the default shell after installation)
- License: Free software (GNU GPL and other licenses)
- Official website: archlinux.org

Arch Linux (Note: Sometimes referred to as just Arch) is an open source, rolling release Linux distribution. Arch Linux is kept up-to-date by regularly updating the individual pieces of software that it comprises. It provides monthly "snapshots" which are used as installation media. Arch Linux is intentionally minimal, and is meant to be configured by the user during installation to add only what is needed.

Pacman, a package manager written specifically for Arch Linux, is used to install, remove and update software packages. The Arch User Repository (AUR) serves as a community-driven software repository for Arch Linux and provides packages not included in the official repositories and alternative versions of packages. AUR packages can be downloaded and built manually, or installed through an AUR 'helper', such as Yet Another Yogurt (yay).

Arch Linux has comprehensive documentation in the form of a community-run wiki known as the ArchWiki.

== History ==
Inspired by CRUX, another minimalist distribution, Judd Vinet began the Arch Linux project in March 2002. The name was chosen because Vinet liked the word's meaning of "the principal," as in "arch-enemy".

Originally only for IA-32 (32-bit x86) CPUs, the first x86-64 installation standard ISO image was released in April 2006.

Vinet led Arch Linux until 1 October 2007, when he stepped down due to lack of time, transferring control of the project to Aaron Griffin.

Until Pacman version 4.0.0, Arch Linux's package manager lacked support for signed packages. Packages and metadata were not verified for authenticity by Pacman during the download-install process. Without package authentication checking, tampered-with or malicious repository mirrors could compromise the integrity of a system. Pacman 4 allowed verification of the package database and packages, but it was disabled by default. In November 2011, package signing became mandatory for new package builds, and as of March 2012, every official package is signed. In June 2012, package signing verification became official and is now enabled by default in the installation process.

The migration to systemd as its init system began in August 2012, and it became the default on new installations in October 2012. It replaced the SysV-style init system, used since the distribution's inception.

The end of i686 support was announced in January 2017, with the February 2017 ISO being the last one including i686 and making the architecture unsupported in November 2017. Since then, the community derivative Arch Linux 32 can be used for i686 hardware.

On 24 February 2020, Aaron Griffin announced that due to his limited involvement with the project, he would, after a voting period, transfer control of the project to Levente Polyak. This change also led to a new 2-year term period being added to the Project Leader position.

In March 2021, Arch Linux developers were thinking of porting Arch Linux packages to x86_64-v3, roughly correlating to the Intel Haswell era of processors.

In April 2021, Arch Linux installation images began including a guided installation script called 'archinstall' by default.

In late 2021, the Arch Linux developers released Pacman 6.0, which enabled parallel downloads.

In February 2022, the Arch Linux developers began offering debug packages.

In September 2024, Valve partnered with Arch Linux developers to support ongoing development efforts with the focus on build service infrastructure and secure signing enclave.

On 14 August 2025, the Arch User Repository, the Arch Linux Forums and the Arch Linux website were hit by a distributed denial-of-service attack. As a result of the attack web services became temporarily unavailable and downloads from the AUR were severely slowed down or impossible.

== Design and principles ==
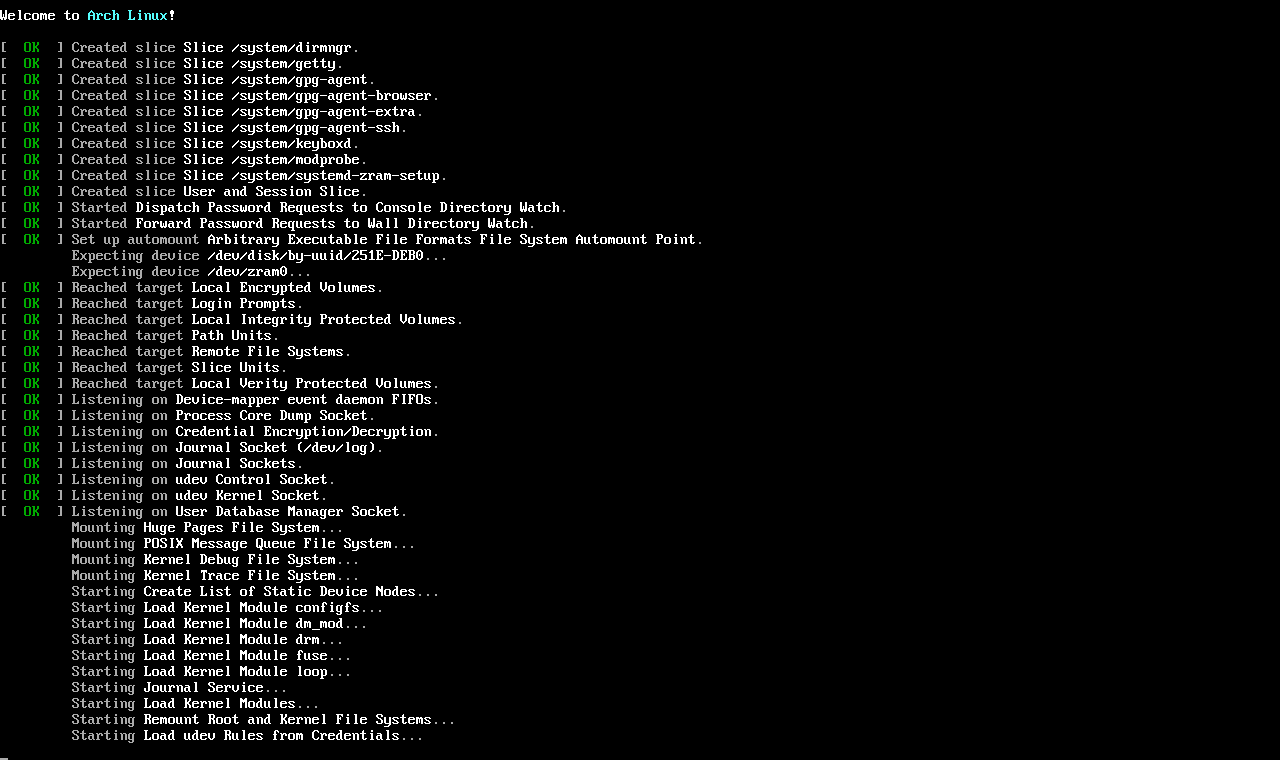
Arch Linux booting

Arch is largely based on binary packages. Packages target x86-64 microprocessors to assist performance on modern hardware. A ports/ebuild-like system is also provided for automated source compilation, known as the Arch build system.

Arch Linux focuses on simplicity of design, meaning that the main focus involves creating an environment that is straightforward and relatively easy for the user to understand directly, rather than providing polished point-and-click style management tools – the package manager, for example, does not have an official graphical front-end. This is largely achieved by encouraging the use of succinctly commented, clean configuration files that are arranged for quick access and editing. This has earned it a reputation as a distribution for "advanced users" who are willing to use the command-line interface.

Relying on complex tools to manage and build your system is going to hurt the end-users. [...] "If you try to hide the complexity of the system, you'll end up with a more complex system". Layers of abstraction that serve to hide internals are never a good thing. Instead, the internals should be designed in a way such that they need no hiding.

— Aaron Griffin

=== Logo ===
The current Arch Linux logo was designed by Thayer Williams in 2007 as part of a contest to replace the previous logo.

== Installation ==
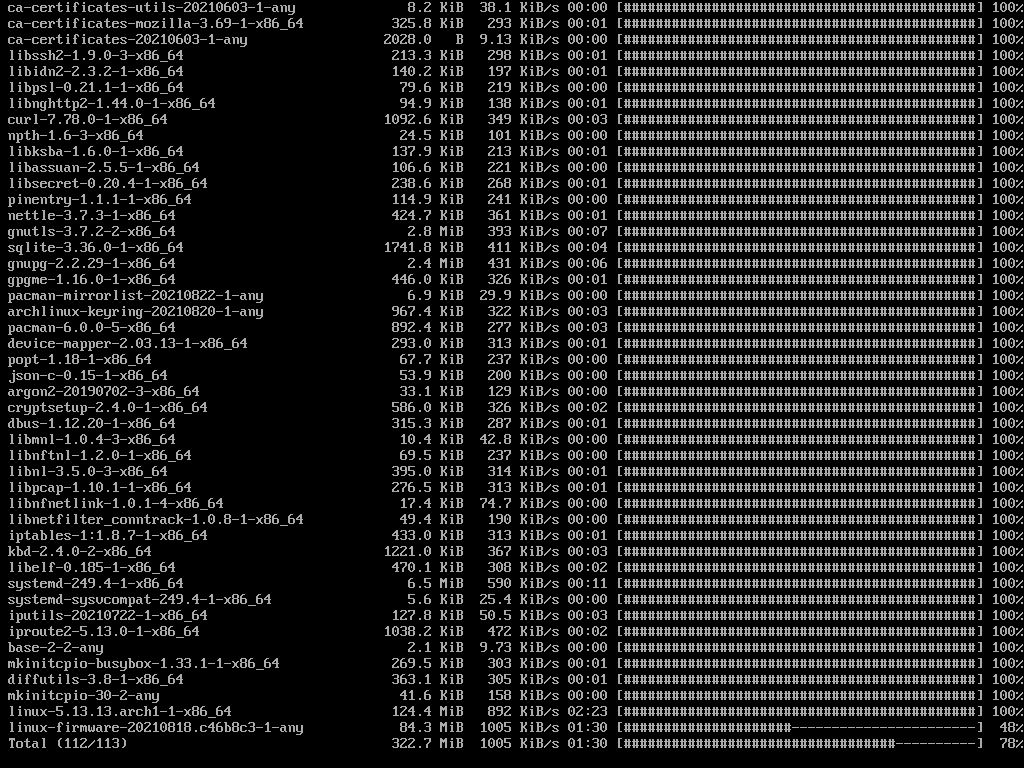
Screenshot of pacstrap during installation

The Arch Linux website supplies mirror links, torrents, etc. for ISO images that may be burned to a CD or USB drive. Installation can be accomplished manually by following the instructions on the Arch Wiki, or automatically through the use of the included "archinstall" script. Another command line utility that comes bundled with the installation media, "pacstrap" may be used to install the base system. Installation of additional packages which are not part of the base system can be done with either pacstrap, Pacman after booting (or chrooting) into the new installation, or by specifying packages within the guided archinstall script.

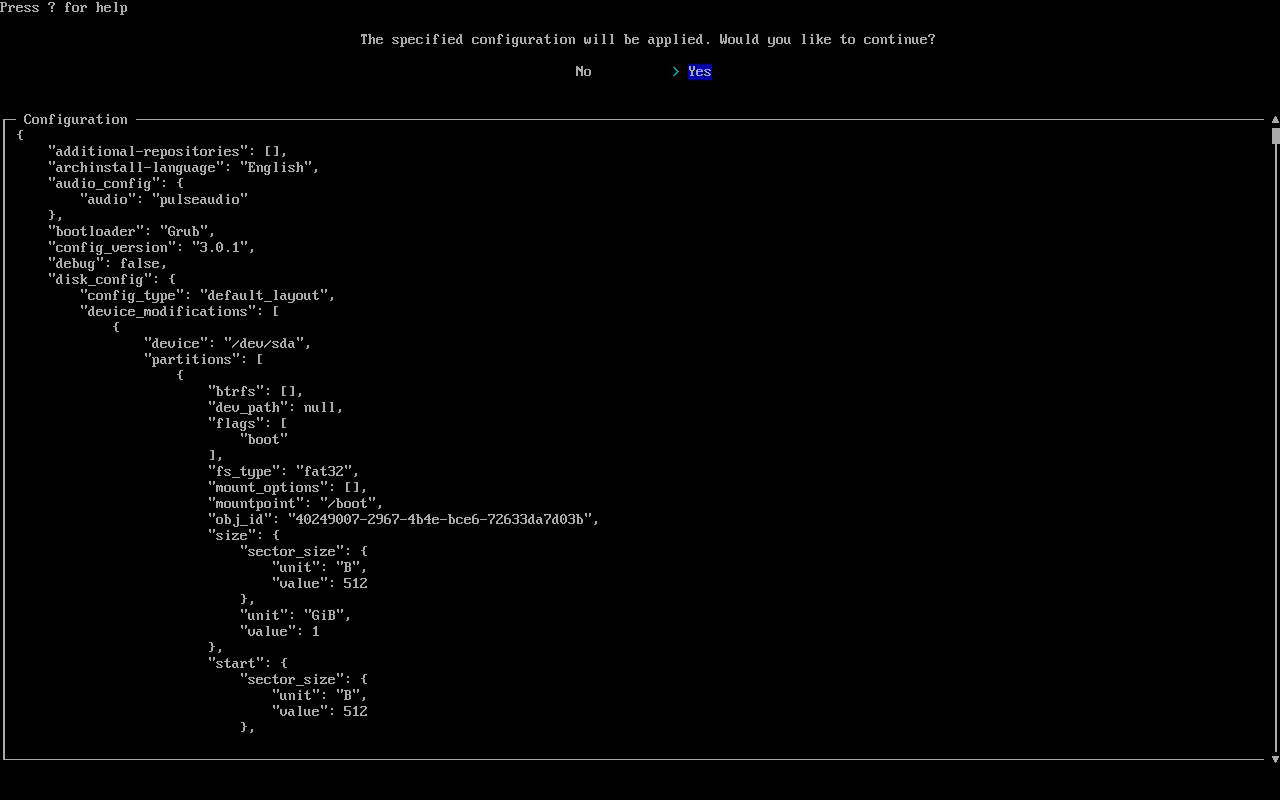
An example configuration for the guided "archinstall" script

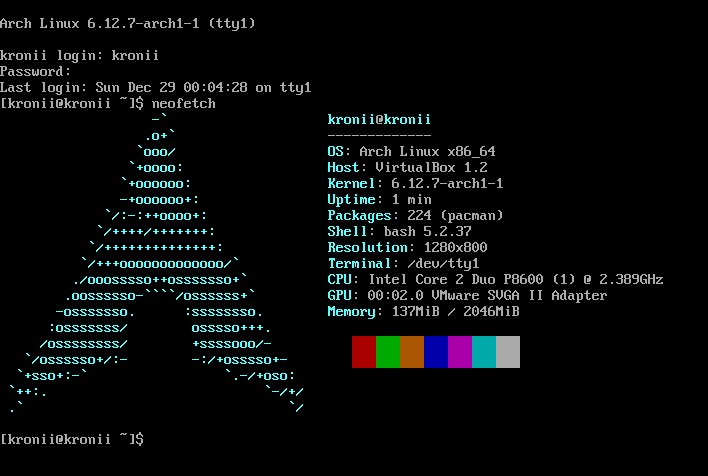
Neofetch output of an Arch Linux installation

An alternative to using CD or USB images for installation is to use the static version of the package manager Pacman, from within another Linux-based operating system. The user can mount their newly formatted drive partition, and use pacstrap (or Pacman with the appropriate command-line switch) to install base and additional packages with the mountpoint of the destination device as the root for its operations. This method is useful when installing Arch Linux onto USB flash drives, or onto a temporarily mounted device which belongs to another system.

Depending on the selected installation type, further actions may need to be taken before the new system is ready for use. Notable configuration includes the installation of a bootloader, configuring the system with a hostname, network connection, language settings, and graphical user interface.

Arch Linux does not schedule releases for specific dates, nor does it provide traditional releases, but instead uses a rolling release model. Packages in the main repositories are updated often, with new updates being pushed far quicker when compared to long-term support (LTS) distributions. This style of package management allows systems to remain updated easily.

Occasionally, manual interventions are needed for certain updates, with instructions posted on the news section of the Arch Linux website.

== Package management ==
=== Pacman ===
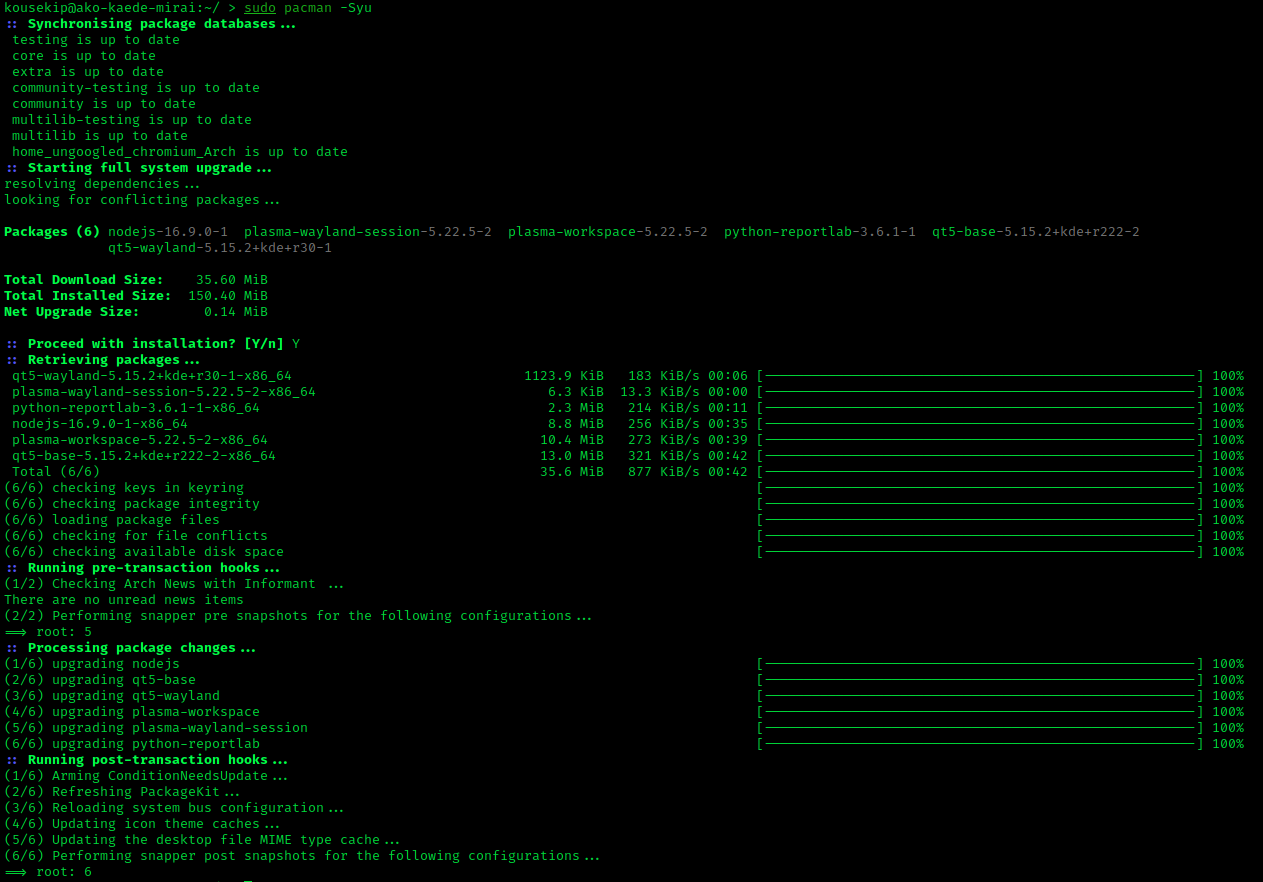
Example of pacman usage

All packages are managed through pacman, a package manager written specifically for Arch Linux. Pacman handles package installation, upgrades, downgrades, removal and features automatic dependency resolution. The packages for Arch Linux are obtained from the Arch Linux package tree and are compiled for the x86-64 architecture.

Pacman typically uses binary packages with a .tar.zst extension (for zstd compression), with .pkg placed before this to indicate that it is a Pacman package (giving .pkg.tar.zst); though other compression formats are also valid, such as .pkg.tar.xz.

Packages can be installed via pacman -S package name, and pacman -Syu can be used to perform a full system upgrade.

As well as Arch Linux, Pacman is also used for installing packages under MSYS2 (a fork of Cygwin) on Windows.

=== Repositories ===
The following official binary repositories exist:

- core, which contains all the packages needed to set up a base system. Packages in this repository include kernel packages and shell languages.
- extra, which holds packages unneeded for the base system, including desktop environments and programs.
- multilib, a centralized repository for x86-64 users to more readily support 32-bit applications in a 64-bit environment. Packages in this repository include Steam.

Also, testing repositories exist which include binary package candidates for other repositories. Currently, the following testing repositories exist:

- core-testing, with packages for core.
- extra-testing, with packages for extra.
- multilib-testing, with packages for multilib.

The core-staging and extra-staging repositories are used for some rebuilds to avoid broken packages in testing. The developers recommend not using these repositories for any reason, stating that any system updating from them will "unquestionably break."

There are also two other repositories that include the newest version of certain desktop environments.

- gnome-unstable, which contains packages of a new version of the software from GNOME before being released into testing.
- kde-unstable, which contains packages of a new version of KDE software before being released into testing.

The unstable repository was dropped in July 2008 and most of the packages moved to other repositories. The community repository was merged with extra in May 2023. In addition to the official repositories, there are a number of unofficial user repositories.

The most well-known unofficial repository is the Arch User Repository, or AUR, hosted on the Arch Linux site. The AUR does not host binary packages but instead a collection of build scripts known as PKGBUILDs. PKGBUILD scripts are executed by the makepkg command, which downloads the necessary files from the software's repository and builds them using the Arch build system.

The Arch Linux repositories contain both libre and nonfree software, and the default Arch Linux kernel contains nonfree proprietary blobs, hence the distribution is not endorsed by the GNU project. The linux-libre kernel can be installed from the AUR or by enabling Parabola's repositories.

=== Arch build system (ABS) ===
The Arch build system (ABS) is a ports-like source packaging system that compiles source tarballs into binary packages, which are installed via Pacman. The Arch build system provides a directory tree of shell scripts, called PKGBUILDs, that enable any and all official Arch packages to be customized and compiled. Rebuilding the entire system using modified compiler flags is also supported by the Arch build system. The Arch build system makepkg tool can be used to create custom pkg.tar.zst packages from third-party sources. The resulting packages are also installable and trackable via Pacman.

=== Arch User Repository (AUR) ===
For packages not provided in the official repositories, the Arch User Repository (AUR) provides user-made PKGBUILD bash scripts which retrieve and build source code or binaries from non-Arch Linux sources. PKGBUILD scripts cannot be downloaded or run by pacman, but they contain all the necessary instructions and metadata to build packages which pacman can install. Unofficial AUR helper programs, like Yay or Paru, can automate installation from the AUR.

However, because scripts not validated by any trusted person may be uploaded to the AUR, Arch developers have stated that utilities for automatic finding, downloading and executing of PKGBUILDs, including AUR helpers, will never be included in the official repositories. Arch Linux directs users to acquaint themselves with the process of vetting PKGBUILDs, including when using AUR helpers. Instances of malware have been discovered in the past, such as on 19 July 2025 when a modified Firefox build contained a Remote access trojan. On 12 June 2026, Arch announced "a high volume of malicious package adoptions and updates in the Arch User Repository", locking down registration and later posing a list of 1579 affected packages that day. The attack consisted of edits to PKGBUILDs adding installation instructions for malicious npm packages. Two days later several packages containing obfuscated malware code, russian spam and profanities were also found and fixed.

Use cases and niches of the AUR include:

- Software that cannot be redistributed due to license restrictions can be included in the AUR since all that is hosted by the Arch Linux website is a shell script that downloads the actual software from elsewhere. Examples include proprietary freeware such as Google Earth and Spotify.
- The AUR contains variations of official and AUR packages, including possibly unstable packages from beta or dev branches. AUR packages which download binaries rather than source code may be provided to remove compilation from the build process.
- Software which is not significant enough to be included in the official repositories may be uploaded to the AUR. AUR packages that have 10 or more votes or more than 1% usage from pkgstats can be promoted into the extra official repository. This requirement is waived in special cases, such as for drivers and dependencies of popular packages.

Package Maintainers, official Arch Linux staff, are charged with "keeping the AUR in working order". They maintain popular packages, communicate with and send patches to developers of packaged software, screen PKGBUILDs for malware, and vote on administrative matters.

=== Reproducible builds ===
Arch Linux is working on making all official packages reproducible. This means that when a package is rebuilt in a different environment it should be bit-by-bit identical. This allows users and researchers to verify the integrity of the packages found in the official repository. The status of this effort can be monitored on the dedicated status page.

== Derivatives and other products ==
The Arch Linux wiki maintains its own list of Arch-based distributions.

There are several projects working on porting the Arch Linux ideas and tools to other kernels, including PacBSD (formerly ArchBSD) and Arch Hurd, which are based on the FreeBSD and GNU Hurd kernels, respectively. There is also the Arch Linux ARM project, which aims to port Arch Linux to ARM-based devices, including the Raspberry Pi, as well as the Arch Linux 32 project, which continued support for systems with 32-bit only CPUs after the mainline Arch Linux project dropped support for the architecture in November 2017.

Artix Linux is based on Arch, and avoids using systemd. Instead, users can choose alternatives like OpenRC, runit, s6, and dinit.

Manjaro is an Arch-based distro designed to be easy to use. Unlike vanilla Arch, Manjaro is designed with both beginners and experienced users in mind.

EndeavourOS is a terminal-centric distro based on Arch, and the successor of the discontinued Antergos.

SteamOS 3.0, the version of SteamOS used in the Steam Deck by Valve, is based on Arch Linux.

CachyOS is a Linux distribution based on Arch Linux with changes and optimizations intended to improve performance on newer hardware, prioritizing gaming, among other tasks. As of March 2026, CachyOS is the most popular desktop distro on ProtonDB, overtaking Arch Linux.

== Reception ==
OSNews reviewed Arch Linux in 2002. OSNews also has five later reviews about Arch Linux.

LWN.net wrote a review about Arch Linux in 2005. LWN.net also has two later reviews about Arch Linux.

Tux Machines reviewed Arch Linux in 2007.

Chris Smart from DistroWatch Weekly wrote a review about Arch Linux in January 2009. DistroWatch Weekly reviewed Arch Linux again in September 2009 and in December 2015.

The Linux kernel developer and maintainer Greg Kroah-Hartman (GKH) has stated that he uses Arch Linux and that it "works really really well". He has also praised the Arch Wiki, the distribution's rolling release model, and the feedback loop with the community.

In a 2023 DistroWatch poll, about half of the respondents maintained that they were running either Arch (17%) or an Arch derivative (30%). As of 2025, Arch also enjoys the third highest average rating of any Linux distribution on DistroWatch with a rating of 9.18, with only two higher rated distributions (Artix Linux and BigLinux) also being Arch derivatives.

== See also ==
- Comparison of Linux distributions
- List of Linux distributions
- GNU variants
