= GNOME Terminal =

Terminal emulator from GNOME

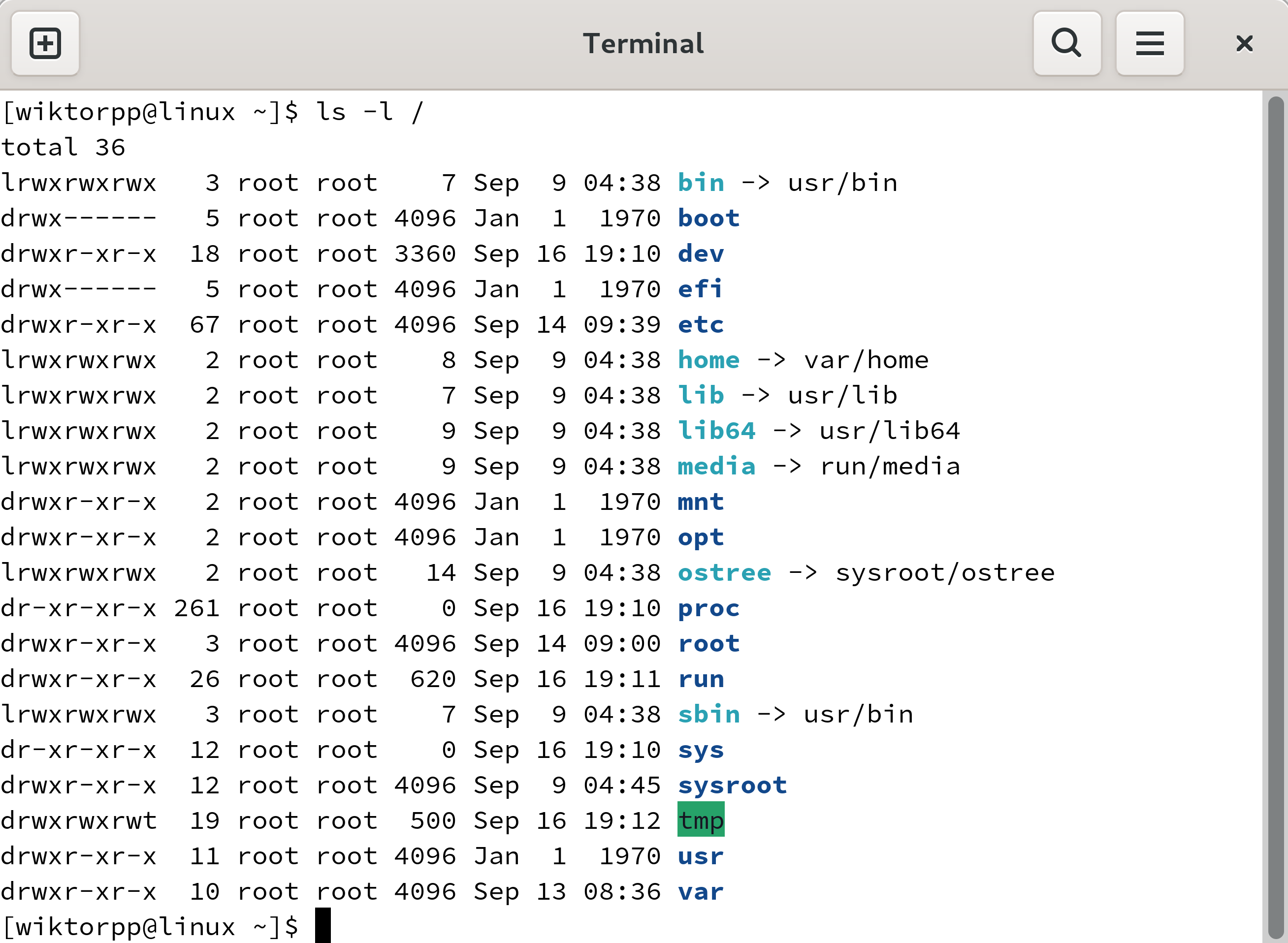
- Screenshot of the GNOME Terminal 3.43
- Developer: The GNOME Project
- Stable release: 3.58.1 / 3 January 2026
- Written in: C
- Operating system: Linux and Unix-like
- Type: Terminal Emulator
- License: GPL-3.0-or-later
- Website: wiki.gnome.org/Apps/Terminal
- Repository: gitlab.gnome.org/GNOME/gnome-terminal.git

GNOME Terminal is a terminal emulator for the GNOME desktop environment written by Havoc Pennington and others. Terminal emulators allow users to access a UNIX shell while remaining on their graphical desktop.

== Features ==
GNOME Terminal (gnome-terminal from the command line or GNOME's Alt-F2 launcher) emulates the xterm terminal emulator and provides some of the same features.

=== Profiles ===
GNOME Terminal supports multiple profiles. A user can create multiple profiles for their account. Users can then set configuration options on a per-profile basis and assign a name to each profile. The available configuration options range from different fonts, different colors, emission of the terminal bell, the behavior of scrolling, and how the terminal handles compatibility with the backspace and delete key.

When GNOME Terminal starts, it can be configured to launch the user's default shell or run a custom command. These options can be configured per profile, allowing users to execute different commands depending on the profile. For example, some users may have one profile to launch their default shell, another profile that connects to another computer remotely through SSH, and finally a profile that opens a GNU Screen session.

=== Compatibility ===
GNOME Terminal supports a couple of different compatibility options for interfacing with older software that depends on varying keyboard-to-ASCII assignments. In computing, there has been ambiguity between the backspace key and delete key. When the user presses the backspace key, the computer can either delete the character before the cursor, or the character at the cursor, which introduces this ambiguity. GNOME Terminal allows the user specify which control character or escape sequence the delete and the backspace keys should generate. Users can specify this option on a per-profile basis.

=== Colored text ===
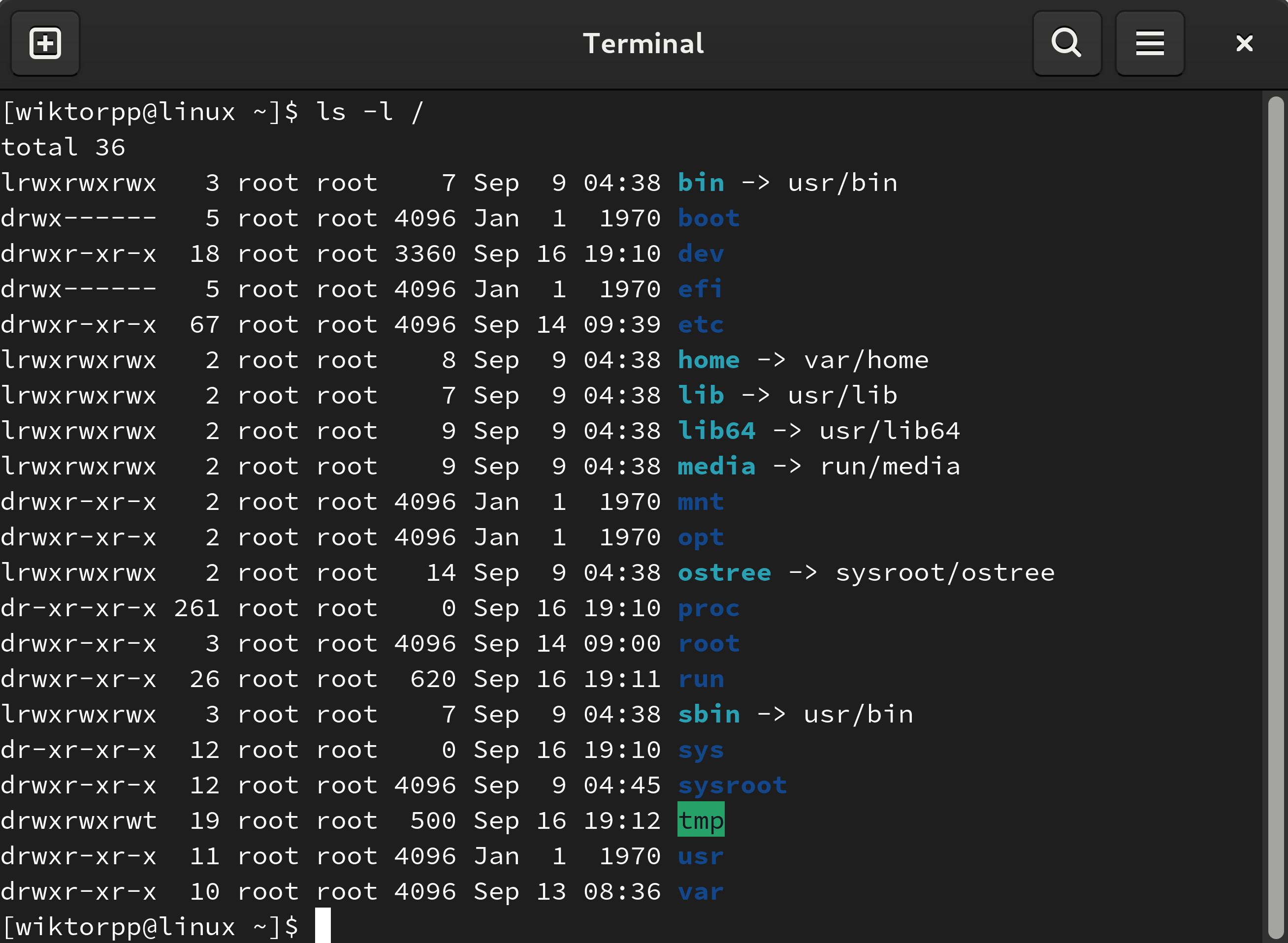
GNOME Terminal 3.43 with the theme set to Adwaita-dark

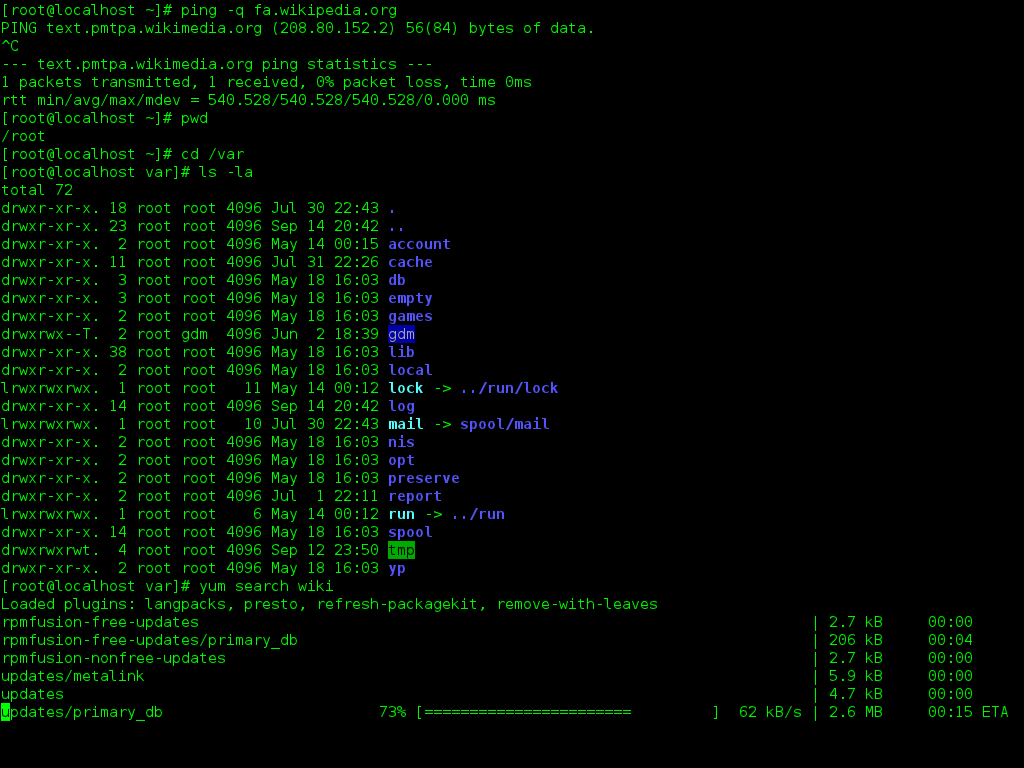
Colored texts in GNOME Terminal 3

Colored text is available in GNOME Terminal, although users may turn this feature off. GNOME Terminal supports a basic set of 16 colors, which the user can choose. Furthermore, GNOME Terminal has support for a palette of 256 colors by default. Some programs, such as vim, can use that many colors.

As of version 3.12, it also supports RGB direct true colors.

=== Background ===
GNOME Terminal allows changing background settings on per profile basis. Available options are solid color.

Older versions also included transparent background option, which allowed to see windows beneath terminal window. Although this option was dropped shortly after 3.6 release, several Linux distributions including Ubuntu and Fedora patch their packages of GNOME Terminal to re-enable this feature.

=== Mouse events ===
Although GNOME Terminal is primarily a command-line interface and uses the keyboard for most input, GNOME Terminal has limited support for mouse events. GNOME Terminal can capture mouse scrolls and both left and right clicks. Presently, it cannot detect the location of the mouse, but some terminal applications can utilize the mouse events, such as aptitude or vim. At this time, there is no support for touch based gestures.

=== Text rewrapping on resizing ===
Since version 3.12 (incorporating version 0.35 of the VTE widget), GNOME Terminal supports text re-wrapping on re-sizing (long lines of text already printed to the terminal's standard out are reflowed to fit the new line width when the dimensions of the terminal window are resized). This behaviour is similar to that of GNU Screen and other curses-based applications such as less.

=== URL detection ===
GNOME Terminal parses the output and automatically detects snippets of text that appear to be URLs or email addresses. When a user points to a URL, the text is automatically underlined, indicating that the user may click. Upon clicking, the appropriate application will open to access that resource.

=== Tabs ===
Multiple terminal sessions may be organized within single GNOME Terminal window as tabs. Switching between active session is possible either by using keyboard shortcuts or by using tab bar – a row of buttons, each corresponding to active session, that appears on top of GNOME Terminal window when multiple tabs are used. Similar to the profile feature, each tab can be assigned a name.

=== Safe quit ===
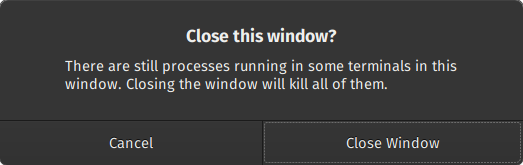
Quit warning in GNOME Terminal 3.32

In recent versions, when the user attempts to quit the entire graphical application, GNOME Terminal will prompt the user with a dialog box asking for confirmation. This feature is intended to reduce the risk of accidentally closing a terminal window (e.g., by clicking the window's close button) with a job still running. If a job is running and the user closes the window, the job will quit and the user will have to restart the job if exiting was an accident.

This feature is only present when the user closes the application through the graphical interface. If the user attempts to quit with the exit shell command, it is the responsibility of the user's shell to confirm the exit. Although not a GNOME Terminal feature, some shells, e.g. tcsh and bash, offer similar functionality and will notify the user that there are stopped jobs.

== Development ==
GNOME Terminal is largely built around the VTE (an acronym for "Virtual TErminal") library, which provides much of the functionality needed to implement a terminal emulator using GObject and GTK. GNOME Terminal and VTE are both written in C.

Several other terminal emulators, such as Xfce Terminal, ROXTerm, evilvte, guake, sakura, terminator, and vala-terminal, depend on VTE.

== Console ==
GNOME Console
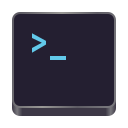
- Original author: Zander Brown
- Developer: The GNOME Project
- Operating system: Linux and Unix-like
- Type: Terminal Emulator
- License: GPL-3.0-or-later
- Website: apps.gnome.org/app/org.gnome.Console/
- Repository: gitlab.gnome.org/GNOME/console/

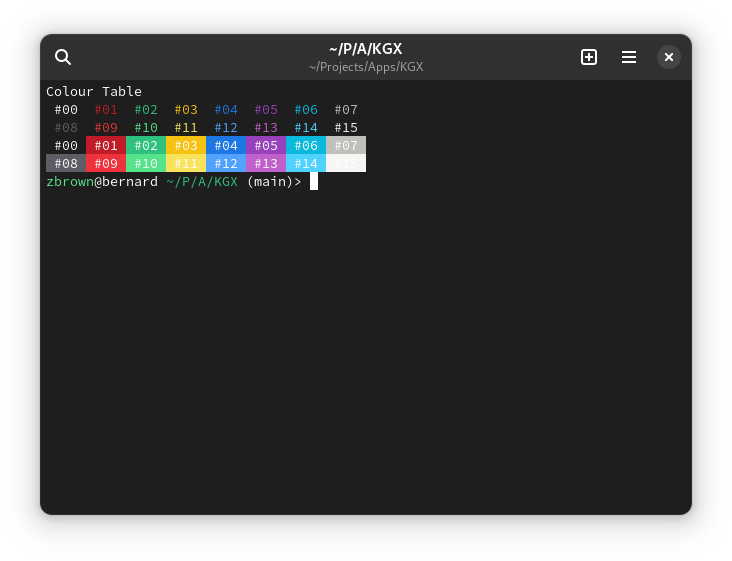
Screenshot of GNOME Console

Console, known internally as kgx, is the default terminal emulator in GNOME. It originated as a terminal emulator for the Phosh mobile interface, which needed an adaptive terminal emulator. It replaced Terminal in GNOME's official core app set with the release of GNOME 42, however Fedora Linux, Red Hat Enterprise Linux, Ubuntu, Debian, CachyOS, and other Linux distributions refused to adopt it or replaced it with another terminal emulator for their GNOME package sets due to its poor feature set, lacking functionality like profiles, container support, the ability to open a terminal session from the working directory, and the ability to customize the color palette, and infrequent maintenance and feature additions despite these missing features.

Dependencies:

- GTK (min 4.19)
- GLib (min 2.80)
- Adwaita (min 1.8)
- vte-gtk4 (min 0.77)
- pango (min 1.51.2)

== Ptyxis ==
Ptyxis
- Original author: Christian Hergert
- Developer: The GNOME Project
- Operating system: Linux and Unix-like
- Type: Terminal Emulator
- License: GPL-3.0-or-later
- Website: gitlab.gnome.org/chergert/ptyxis
- Repository: gitlab.gnome.org/chergert/ptyxis

Ptyxis, originally known as Prompt, is a container-oriented terminal emulator, initially intended as a companion to GNOME Builder. Fedora Linux, Red Hat Enterprise Linux, Debian, Ubuntu, and CachyOS include it by default in their GNOME package sets.

Dependencies:

- C compiler (e.g., GCC, Clang)
- Meson (version 1.0.0 or newer)
- Ninja
- GLib (version 2.80 or newer, e.g., libglib2.0-dev)
- GTK4 (version 4.14 or newer, e.g., libgtk-4-dev)
- libadwaita (version 1.6 or newer, e.g., libadwaita-1-dev)
- JSON-GLib (version 1.6 or newer, e.g., libjson-glib-dev)
- VTE (GTK4 version, 0.79 or newer, e.g., libvte-2.91-gtk4-dev) gitlab.gnome.org/…/vte
  - a LGPL2+-licensed library containing a virtual terminal emulator widget for GTK
  - written in C++
  - two versions: libvte-2.91.so for GTK+ 3 and libvte-2.91-gtk4.so is a library which implements a terminal emulator widget for GTK-4
  - widely adopted, e.g. Xfce Terminal (Xfce), lxterminal (LXDE), …
- libportal-gtk4 (on Linux, e.g., libportal-gtk4-dev)

== See also ==
- List of terminal emulators
- ANSI escape code
