= Thomas Bushnell =

American software programmer (born 1967)

Thomas Bushnell, BSG
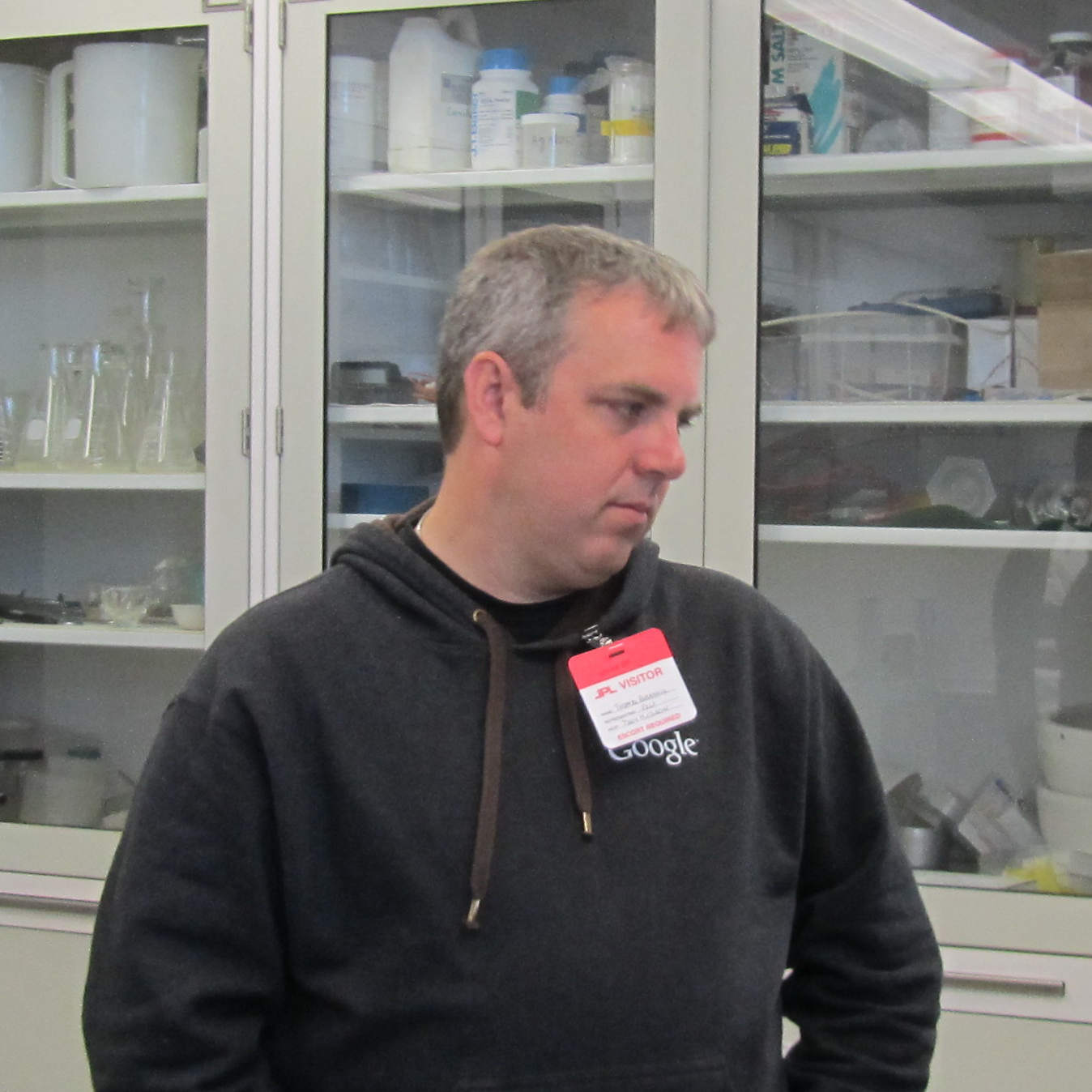
- Bushnell at JPL in 2011
- Born: December 13, 1967 (age 58); Albuquerque, New Mexico
- Other name: formerly Michael Bushnell
- Education: UMass Boston (BA, 1999); UC Irvine (PhD, 2007)
- Known for: GNU Hurd
- Scientific career
- Thesis: Peter Abelard's conception of the good (2007)
- Doctoral advisor: Bonnie Kent
- Website: tb.becket.net

Thomas Bushnell BSG (born December 13, 1967), formerly known as Michael Bushnell, is a software developer and Gregorian friar. He was the founder and principal architect of GNU's official kernel project, the GNU Hurd. Bushnell was Hurd's official maintainer from its instigation until November 2003. Bushnell was previously a Debian developer, and was employed by Google LLC from July 2010 until the January 2024 layoffs. He is a member of Saint Mark's Episcopal Church in Glendale, California.

== Early life and education ==
Bushnell was born on December 13, 1967, in Albuquerque, New Mexico.

Bushnell attended Carnegie Mellon University for one year in 1985–1986, and then almost two years at the University of New Mexico. Later on, he eventually graduated 1999 summa cum laude from the University of Massachusetts Boston with Bachelor's degrees in philosophy and classics. In 2007 he completed his PhD at the University of California, Irvine under supervisor Professor Bonnie Kent, with his dissertation titled Peter Abelard's Conception of the Good.

== Software development ==
=== GNU Hurd ===
The GNU Hurd kernel was launched in 1990 and Bushnell was the lead developer. This kernel was to be one of the last free software components needed to complete the GNU operating system. The project was experiencing delays however for various reasons, one of them being that Bushnell "several times redesigned and rewrote large parts of the code based on what he had learned, rather than trying to make the Hurd run as soon as possible", according to Richard Stallman. Stallman stated that "it was good design practice, but it wasn’t the right practice for our goal: to get something working ASAP".

Bushnell was Hurd's official maintainer from its instigation until November 2003, when he posted to the GNU project's discussion mailing list saying that he had been dismissed by Stallman for criticizing the GNU Free Documentation License. Stallman said the dismissal was because Bushnell had been inactive since 2001 and wasn't responding to mail.

=== Goobuntu ===
Bushnell previously worked on Goobuntu, a Linux distribution based on Ubuntu created by Google.

== Comments on Stallman ==
Following Richard Stallman's resignation as president of the Free Software Foundation and his guest position at MIT, Bushnell wrote on Medium that although he felt sympathy for Stallman, he believed it was good for the free software community that he had stepped down.
