= GNU variants =

Operating systems based on GNU

GNU mascot, by Aurelio A. Heckert (derived from a more detailed version by Etienne Suvasa)

GNU variants are operating systems based upon the GNU operating system (namely those whose components include the GNU C library and system libraries; application software like GNU coreutils and bash; sometimes also the Hurd kernel, the Guix package manager, etc.). According to the GNU Project, these also include most operating systems using the Linux kernel and a few others using BSD-based kernels.

GNU variants use GNU user space software in combination with a kernel. The kernel of an operating system is the portion of the operating system that controls the system hardware and provides basic services to other parts of the operating system. The GNU kernel is the GNU Hurd; the Linux kernel and other kernels are also used in GNU variants.

GNU users usually obtain their operating system by downloading GNU distributions, which are available for a wide variety of systems ranging from embedded devices (for example, LibreCMC) and personal computers (for example, Debian GNU/Hurd) to powerful supercomputers (for example, Rocks Cluster Distribution).

== The GNU Project ==
GNU software is developed by the GNU Project, which was launched by Richard Stallman in 1983 to create an operating system according to the principles of the free software movement. Development work began in 1984 following his resignation from the MIT Artificial Intelligence Lab to work on the project full-time to avoid potential issues with MIT claiming ownership over the software Richard Stallman would write.

== GNU Hurd ==
Logo of GNU Hurd

Hurd is one of two official kernels developed for the GNU system, and was the exclusive official kernel before Linux-libre also became an official GNU package. The Hurd implements a microkernel based operating system kernel design, making use of GNU Mach as its core microkernel, where the Hurd consists of the broader set of usermode device drivers and internal servers necessary for the function of the operating system. As of 2026 the kernel is not yet considered production-ready and because of its development status as experimental it has not gained widespread adoption. However experimental system distributions making use of it do exist and are used in hobbyist and enthusiast circles as well as research projects.

== Complete GNU operating systems ==
The GNU operating system is a Unix-like system; software from the GNU operating system has been ported to several other Unix-like operating systems. This allows that software to run atop kernels other than the GNU Hurd kernel, this way forming new operating system distributions that take a kernel taken from another typically Unix-like operating system and combine it with user space software from the GNU operating system, modified as necessary to operate with the new kernel, to form a new system.

=== Hurd kernel ===
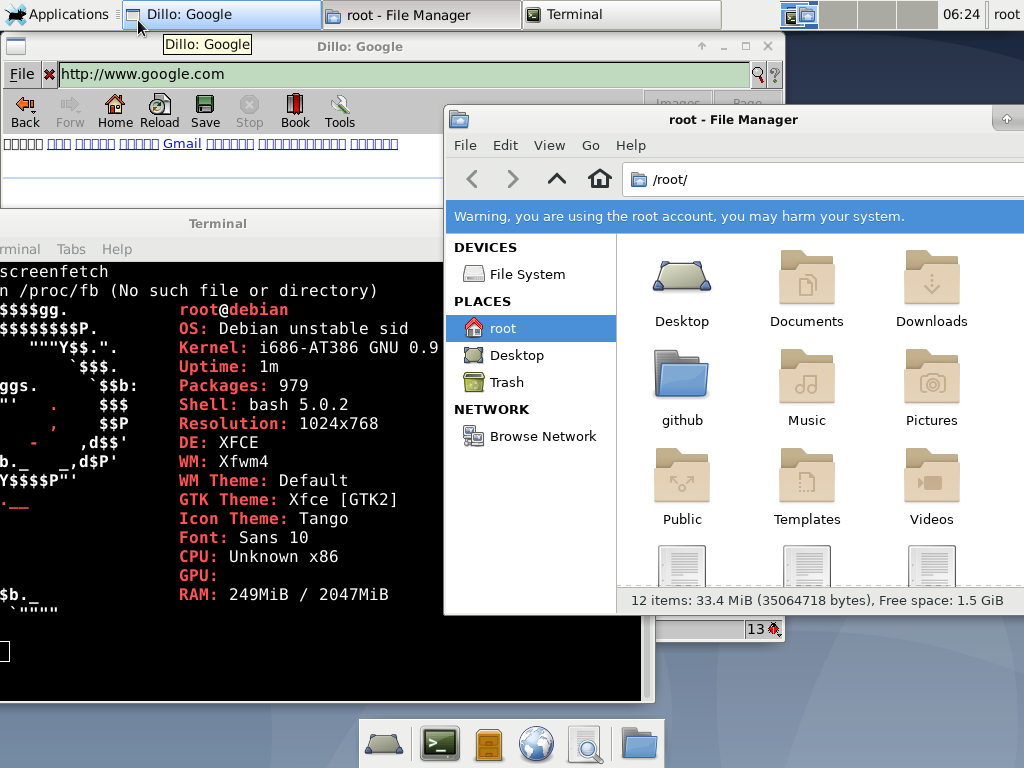
A Screenshot of Debian GNU/Hurd with the Xfce desktop environment

Debian GNU/Hurd was discussed for a release as technology preview with Debian 7.0 Wheezy, however these plans were discarded due to the immature state of the system. However the maintainers of Debian GNU/Hurd decided to publish an unofficial release on the release date of Debian 7.0. Debian GNU/Hurd is not considered yet to provide the performance and stability expected from a production system. Debian GNU/Hurd added support for the x86-64 architecture in the release for 2025, Hurd having integrated NetBSD's disk driver via its Rump kernel feature. As of March 21, 2026, about three quarters of the Debian packages have been ported to Hurd.

Logo of Arch Hurd

Arch Hurd is a derivative work of Arch Linux, porting it to the GNU Hurd system with packages optimised for the Intel P6 architecture. Their goal is to provide an Arch-like user environment (BSD-style init scripts, pacman package manager, rolling releases, and a simple set up) on the GNU Hurd, which is stable enough for at least occasional use. Currently it provides a Live CD for evaluation purposes and installation guides for Live CD and conventional installation.

The Guix System, a variant of the GNU operating system based around the use of the GNU Guix package manager, both developed officially under the GNU Project umbrella, is mainly distributed using the linux-libre kernel, however the project is working on support for the Hurd kernel. An experimental disk image intended for use in a virtual machine is provided on the project's download page.

On April 1, 2026, Gentoo announced a port to GNU Hurd. The post was presented as an April Fools joke about switching the entire system to using GNU's Hurd exclusively in place of Linux, stating "Despite the experimental status of the port, we’ve found the Hurd to be immensely more robust, and hope to be able to discontinue Linux support by the end of 2026", but the part about releasing a new GNU/Hurd variant was genuine news and the project now distributes a pre-prepared disk image on their website as well as scripts to build the image.

=== Linux kernel (and linux-libre) ===
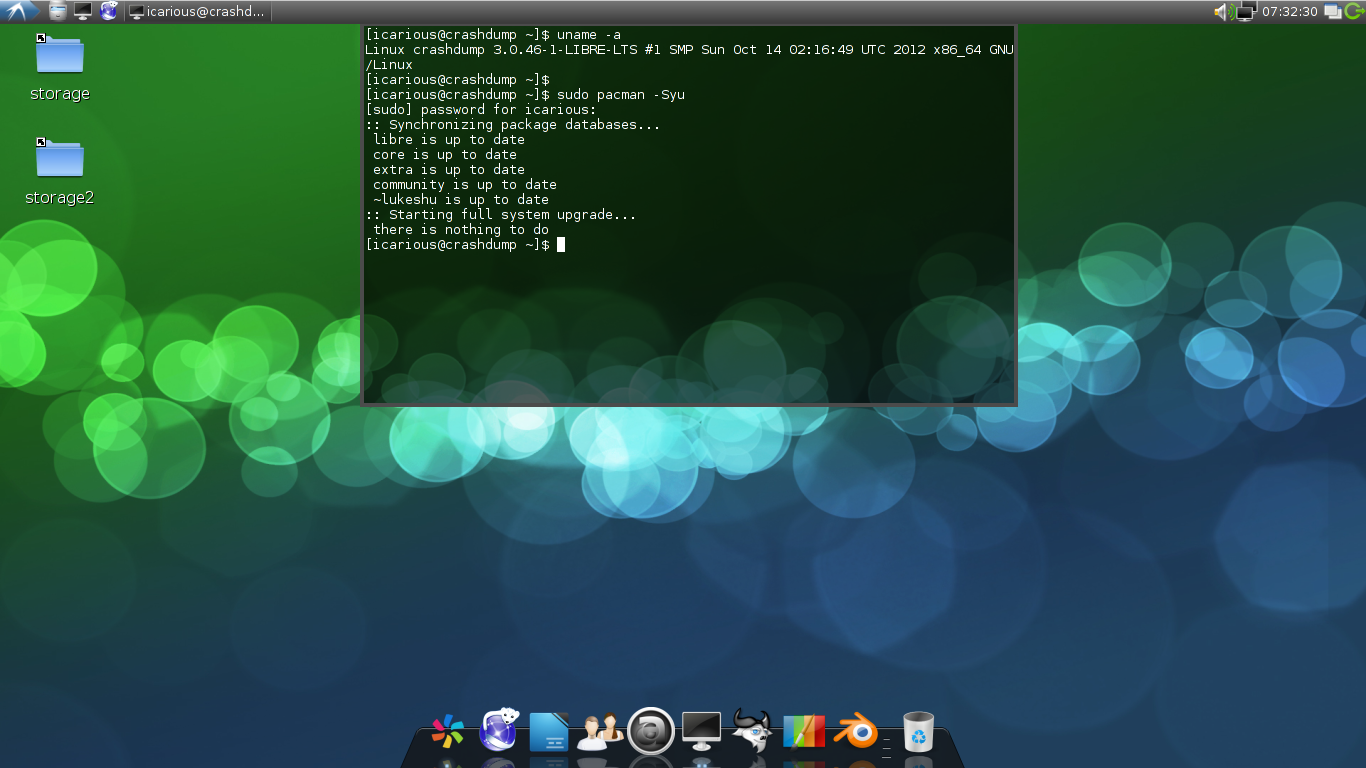
Parabola is an example of a Linux-using GNU variant endorsed by the FSF as a "fully free" system.

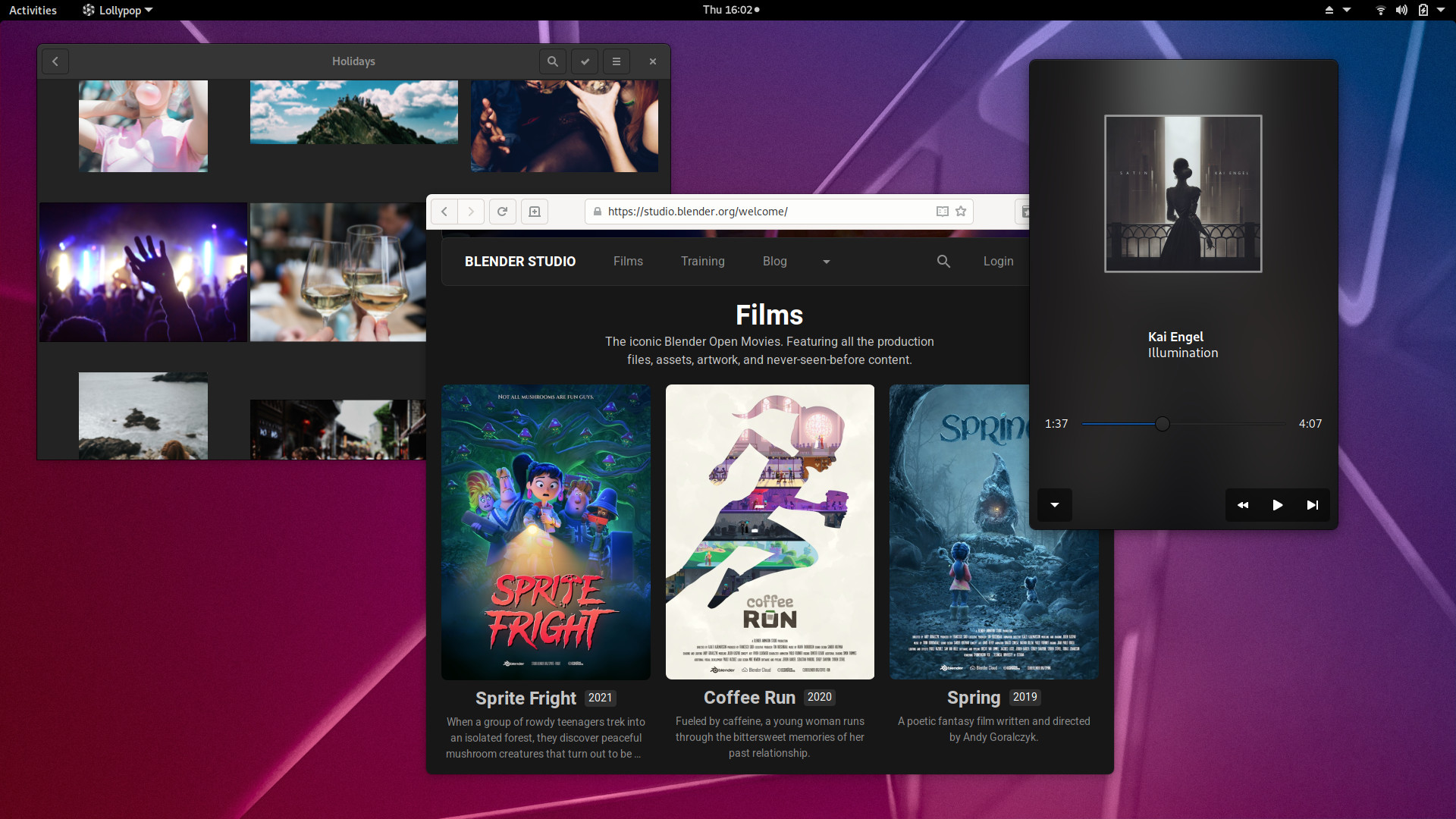
PureOS 10.0 with GNOME

The term GNU/Linux or GNU+Linux is used by the Free Software Foundation (FSF) and its supporters to refer to an operating system where the Linux kernel is distributed with a GNU system software. Such distributions are the primary installed base of GNU packages and programs and also of Linux. The most notable official use of this term for a distribution is Debian GNU/Linux.

As of February 2026, the only GNU variants recommended by the GNU Project for regular use are systems which make use of the Linux kernel; most of which refer to themselves as "GNU/Linux", and use a deblobbed version of the Linux kernel (like the Linux-libre kernel) instead of the mainline Linux kernel. The full list of non-historical GNU variant distributions recommended by the GNU project are Dragora GNU/Linux-Libre, Dyne:bolic GNU/Linux, GNU Guix System, Hyperbola GNU/Linux-libre, Parabola GNU/Linux-libre, PureOS, Trisquel GNU/Linux, libreCMC, and ProteanOS each of which strictly adhere to the Free System Distribution Guidelines (FSDG).

=== BSD kernels ===
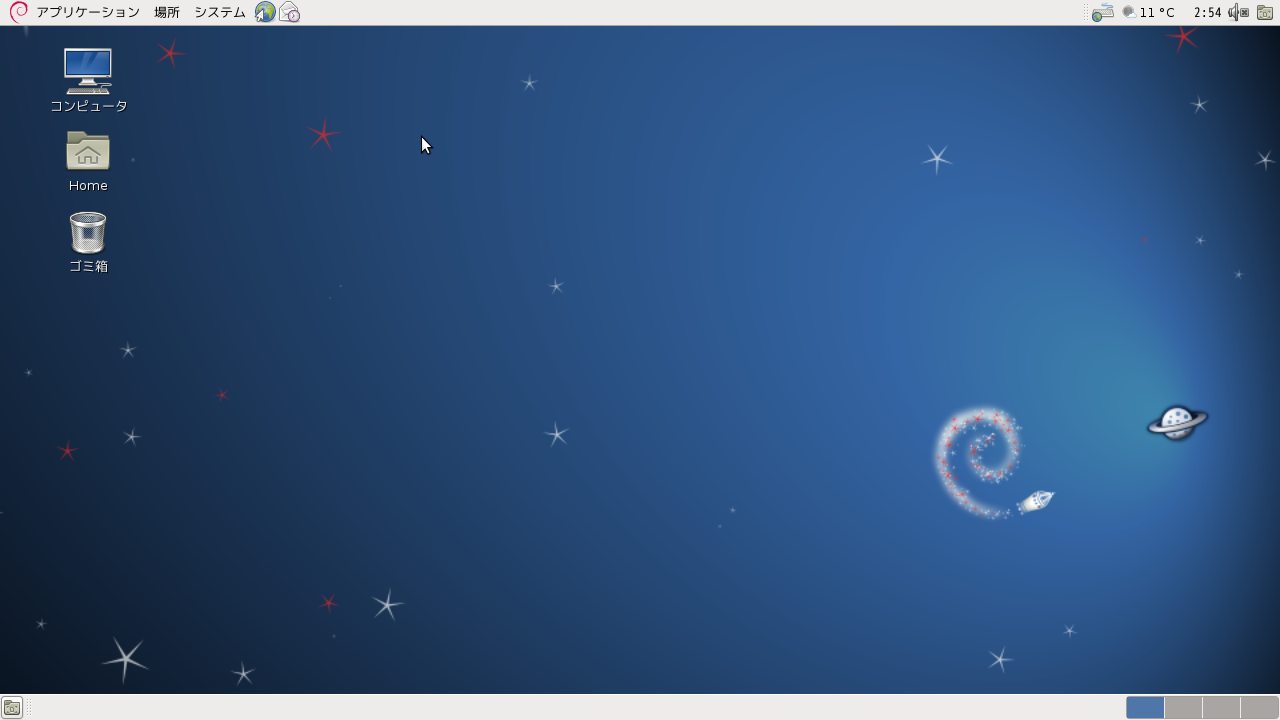
Debian GNU/kFreeBSD in Japanese featuring the Xfce desktop environment

Debian GNU/kFreeBSD is a discontinued distribution of GNU with Debian package management and the kernel of FreeBSD for IA-32 and x86-64 computer instruction set architectures. The k in kFreeBSD is an abbreviation for kernel of, and reflects the fact that only the kernel of the complete FreeBSD operating system is used. The operating system received an official release with Debian Squeeze (6.0) on February 6, 2011.Prior to its official release, a derivative of Debian GNU/kFreeBSD, called Ging (A recursive acronym for Ging Is Not Ging), was released as a live CD in 2005 by Robert Millan as a fully Free Software distribution under the DFSG, and featured the KDE desktop environment. It has not had further releases since 2005.

Debian GNU/NetBSD was an experimental port of GNU userland applications to NetBSD kernel. No official release of this operating system was made; although work was conducted on ports for the IA-32 and DEC Alpha architectures, it has not seen active maintenance since 2002 and is no longer available for download.

There was a development effort to combine Debian with OpenBSD to form a Debian GNU/OpenBSD that did not materialize.

PacBSD (formerly ArchBSD), is an operating system derived from Arch Linux using a BSD derived kernel together with the GNU userland.

As of April 2026, the GNU Project does not recommend or endorse any BSD operating systems due to them not strictly adhering to the Free System Distribution Guidelines required by the GNU Project.

=== OpenSolaris and Illumos kernel ===
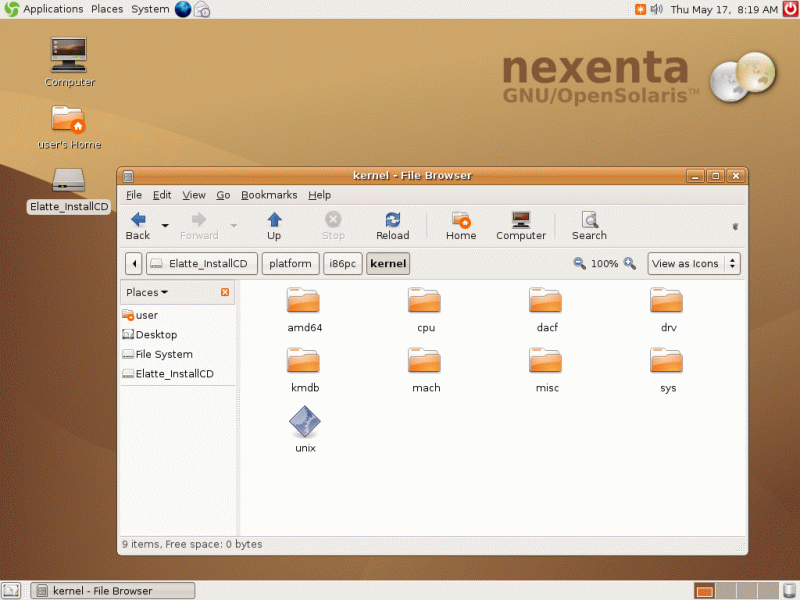
Nexenta OS Alpha 5 running GNOME 2.14

Nexenta OS is the first GNU-based operating system using the kernel from OpenSolaris. Nexenta OS was developed by Nexenta Systems, taking the userland from Ubuntu (GNU) and making use of Debian's package management software, also shared on Ubuntu. The project hoped to become an official part of the Debian project as a variant, but this did not come to be. The last version Nexenta OS was released in October 31, 2012. Nexenta OS is available for IA-32 and x86-64 instruction set architectures. Nexenta OS takes its libc from OpenSolaris instead of from the GNU Project.

Dyson is a general purpose operating system for desktop and server use, combining most of Debian's userspace software such as the GNU userland and the APT packaging tools and its packages, with a kernel and other tools taken from Illumos. The project aims to produce a system as similar to Debian as possible. The operating system is available for x86-64 based computer architectures. The latest version was released in 2019. The system also provides many of OpenSolaris' features such as the ZFS file system, Solaris Containers, IPFilter, DTrace, Solaris network virtualization and resource control; it uses the libc and SMF init system from OpenSolaris.

=== Minix kernel ===
There has been a development effort, called the Preventa Project, to port Debian to run on the Minix 3 kernel, thus forming an unofficial Debian GNU/Minix similar to Debian GNU/kFreeBSD or Debian GNU/NetBSD. The project aims to combine Debian's base system and its packing tools (APT and dpkg) along with the GNU userland to run on the kernel of Minix 3 with the intention of also using the libc from Minix.

=== MiNT ===
There was a project to form an unofficial Debian GNU/MiNT operating system using MiNT and SpareMiNT. The project did not lead to much success and further development efforts have seized.

== GNU distributions for use on other operating systems ==
=== XNU (Darwin) kernel ===
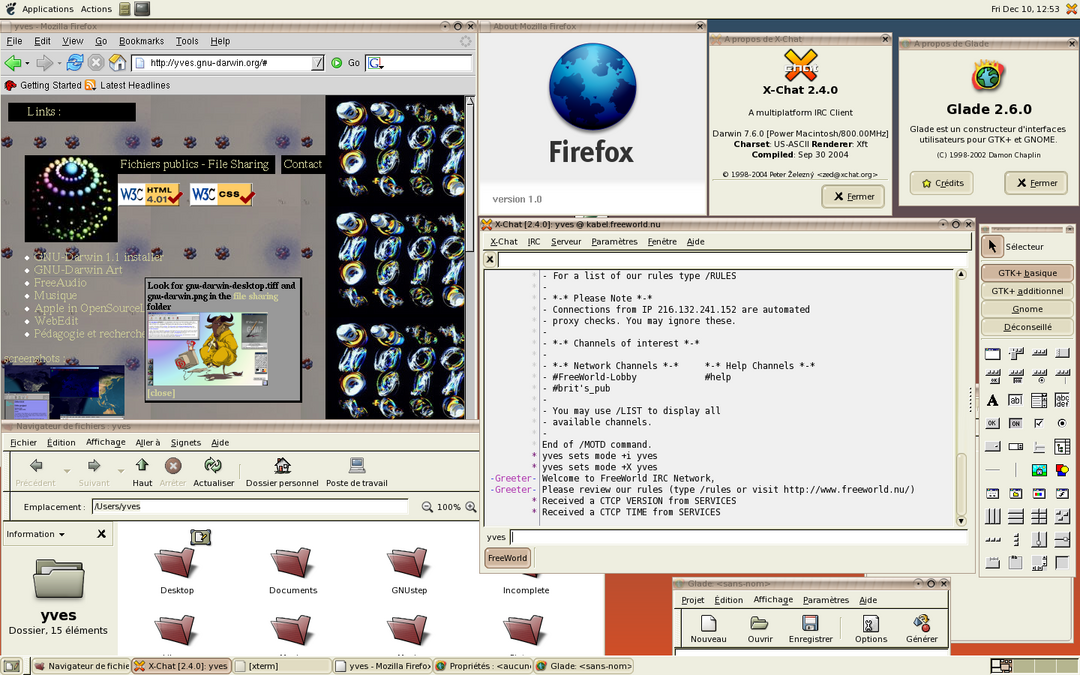
GNU-Darwin installed on openDarwin, with the GNOME 2 desktop environment

The GNU-Darwin project developed for the PowerPC and x86 platforms a distribution of GNU software meant for use within a Darwin system environment, which unlike conventional bootable system installers, the distribution CD installs on top of an existing Darwin installation. The distributed GNU environment contains as many as 250 applications and libraries and more. The distribution CDs allow for installing on top of a Darwin version 7 or 8, or MacOS 10.3 or 10.4 installation. The project was founded by proclus in November 2000. The project also distributed a complete system installation of GNU-Darwin preinstalled and available on a hard drive sold on their web site. The hard drive distributed with the preinstalled GNU-Darwin system was available for both the PowerPC and x86 options and had the same compatibility with MacOS and Darwin as the CD distribution. The GNU-Darwin project's mission is heavily tied to the philosophy of the free software movement and surrounding ideas. GNU-Darwin was considered production-ready and mature, its intended application included enterprise, production, and scientific use and was also suitable for workstation use.

=== Windows NT kernel ===
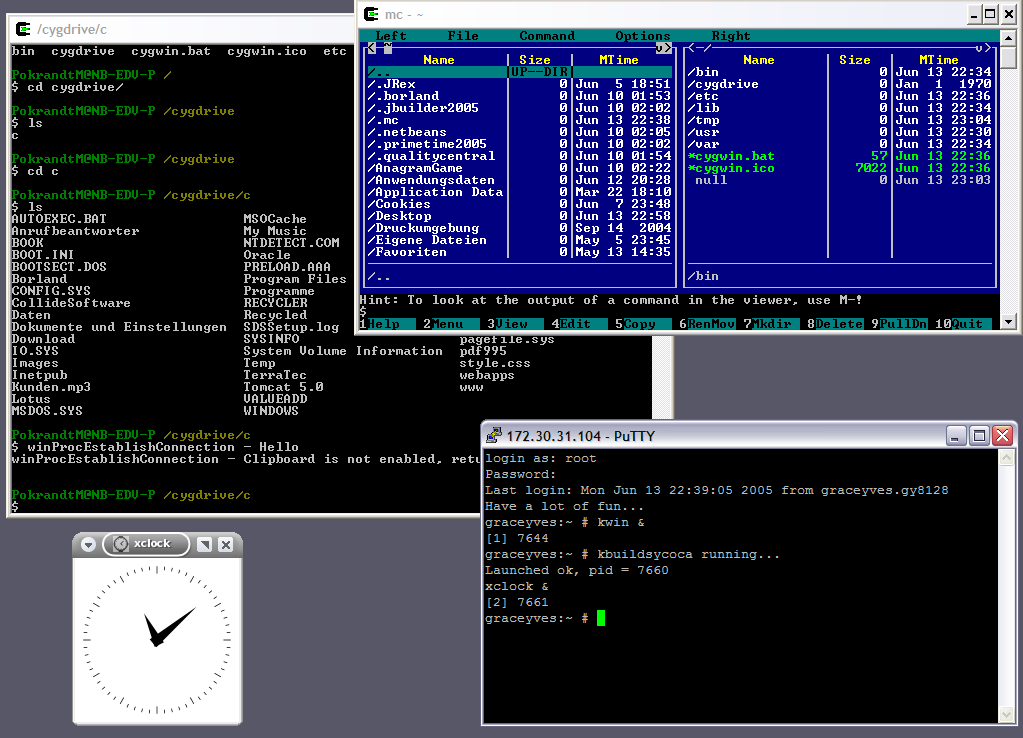
Cygwin Running the X11-Server in rootless-mode with 2 open Cygwin bash-consoles under WinXP (one is running a Midnight-Commander session) and a remote GUI-app (xclock) (tunneled over SSH via putty)

The Cygwin project is an actively-developed compatibility layer in the form of a C library providing a substantial part of the POSIX API functionality for Windows, as well as a distribution of GNU and other Unix-like programs for such an ecosystem. It was first released in 1995 by Cygnus Solutions (now Red Hat).

=== FreeBSD ===
As part of one of their official software distribution channels for third party software, the FreeBSD project distributes a port of the GNU coreutils for use on the FreeBSD operating system, in their FreeBSD Ports Collection.

== GNU software used in other operating systems ==
On 20 January 2024 Sergey Bugaev announced on a GNU Project's mailing list that he had been working on a derivative of Alpine Linux using the Hurd kernel instead of Linux. The project was also mentioned on FOSDEM's 2026 event by Samuel Thibault, who is involved in the Debian GNU/Hurd project. Alpine Linux notably does not make use of GNU software, so the introduction of the Hurd kernel makes such a derivative a unique GNU based operating system due to its use of the Hurd kernel without the rest of the GNU userland software.

== See also ==
- The GNU Project
- Hurd kernel
- Berkeley Software Distribution
- illumos
- Darwin (operating system)
- Linux kernel
- Minix 3
- Free software movement
