= Soli Deo gloria =

Latin sentence from the Vulgate bible

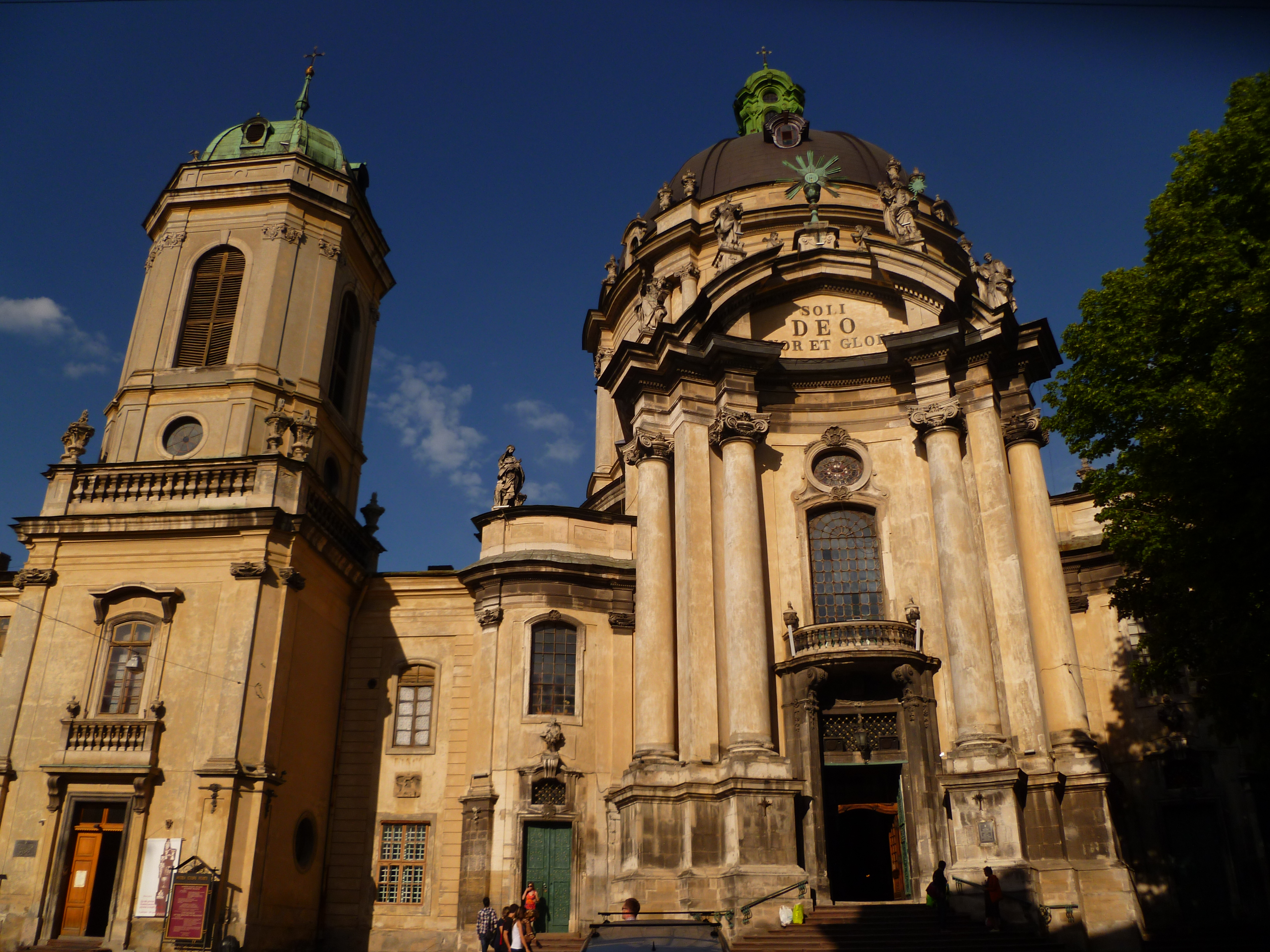
Main facade of the Dominican Church in Lviv with the Latin phrase "Soli Deo honor et gloria"

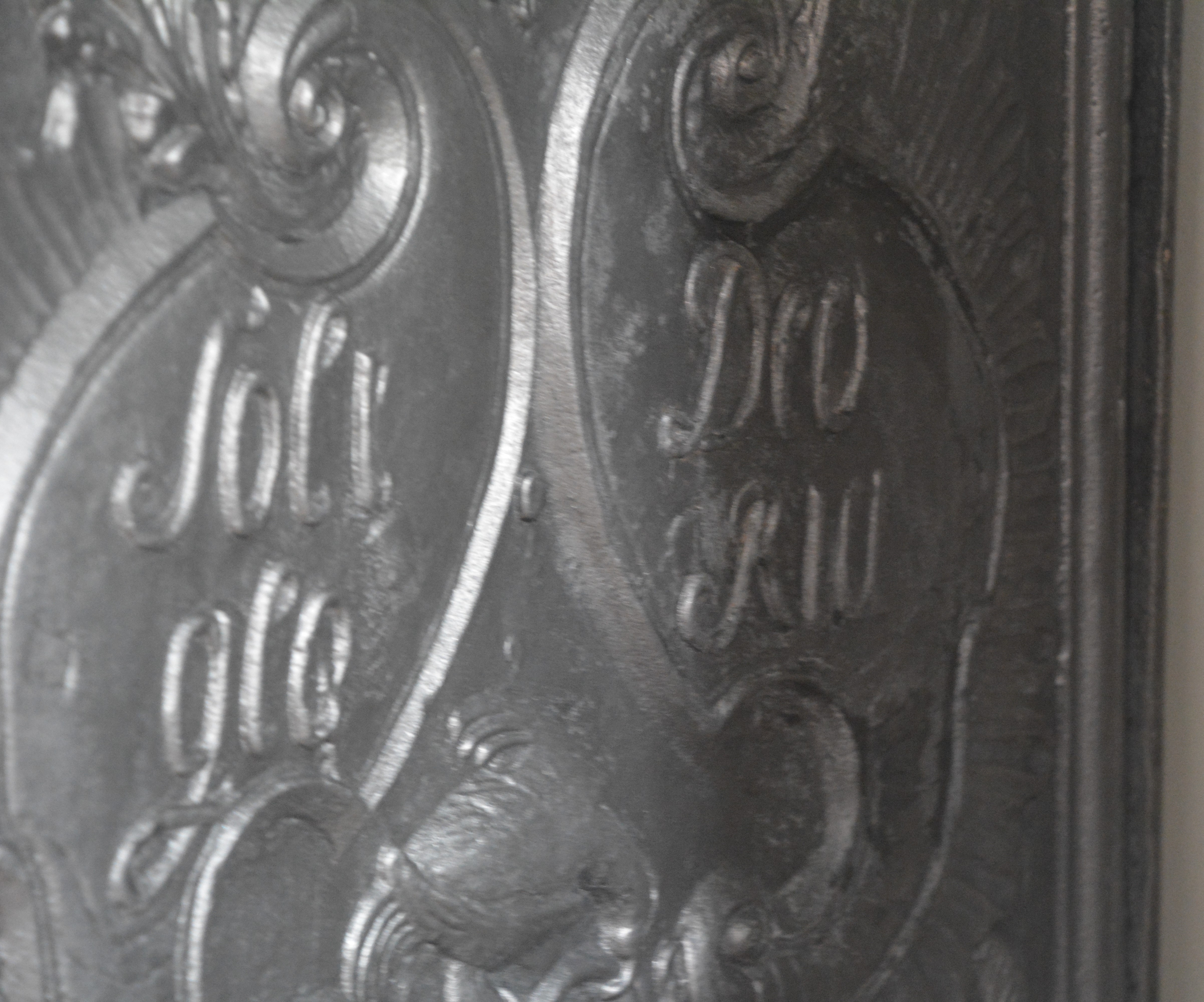
"Soli Deo gloria" inscripted in Norwegian cast-iron stove from the 19th century

Soli Deo gloria (S.D.G.) is a Latin term for Glory to God alone. It has been used by artists like Johann Sebastian Bach, George Frideric Handel, and Christoph Graupner to signify that the work was produced for the sake of praising God. The phrase has become one of the five solae propounded to summarise the Reformers' basic beliefs during the Protestant Reformation.

As a greeting, it was used by monks in Cistercian and Trappist monastic orders in written communication.

As a doctrine, it means that everything is done for God's glory to the exclusion of humankind's self-glorification and pride. Christians are to be motivated and inspired by God's glory and not their own.

== Meaning and related terms ==
Soli Deo gloria (abbreviated S. D. G.) is usually translated glory to God alone, but some translate it glory to the only God. A similar phrase is found in the Vulgate translation of the Bible: "soli Deo honor et gloria" in 1 Timothy 1:17. The verse reads differently in Greek and English because of the additional adjective "wise": ἀφθαρτῷ, ἀορατῷ, μόνῳ, σοφῷ Θεῷ—aphthartó, aorató, móno, sophó Theó—"to the immortal, invisible, unique, wise God."

== Musical and literary usage ==
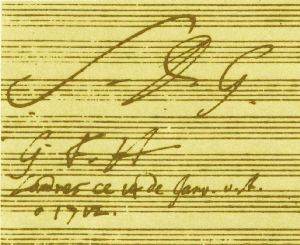
"S. D. G." (for Soli Deo gloria) at the end of a G. F. Handel manuscript

The Baroque composer Johann Sebastian Bach wrote the initials "S. D. G." at the end of all his church compositions and also applied it to some, but not all, his secular works. This dedication was at times also used by Bach's contemporary George Frideric Handel, e.g. in his Te Deum. The 16th century Spanish mystic and poet St. John of the Cross used the similar phrase Soli Deo honor et gloria in his Precautions and Counsels.

In tribute to Bach, the term was also chosen by Sir John Eliot Gardiner as the name for his own record label after leaving Archiv Produktion, to continue and complete his Bach cantatas project.

Aaron Shust's 2009 song "To God Alone (be the Glory)" was inspired by Bach's writing "S.D.G." at the bottom of his musical scores.

== Protestant usage in the Five Solae ==
Together with sola fide, sola gratia, sola scriptura and solus Christus, the phrase has become part of what is known as the Five Solae, a summary statement of central tenets of the Protestant Reformation. Although these individual phrases have been used for centuries, it is not clear when they were first put together.

== Other denominational views ==
In Eastern Orthodox and Roman Catholic theology, the term latria is used for the form of adoration and glorification directed only to the Holy Trinity. The term dulia is used for saints in general and hyperdulia (below latria, above dulia) for the Virgin Mary. The definition of the three level hierarchy of latria, hyperdulia and dulia goes back to the Second Council of Nicaea in 787.

== Mottos ==
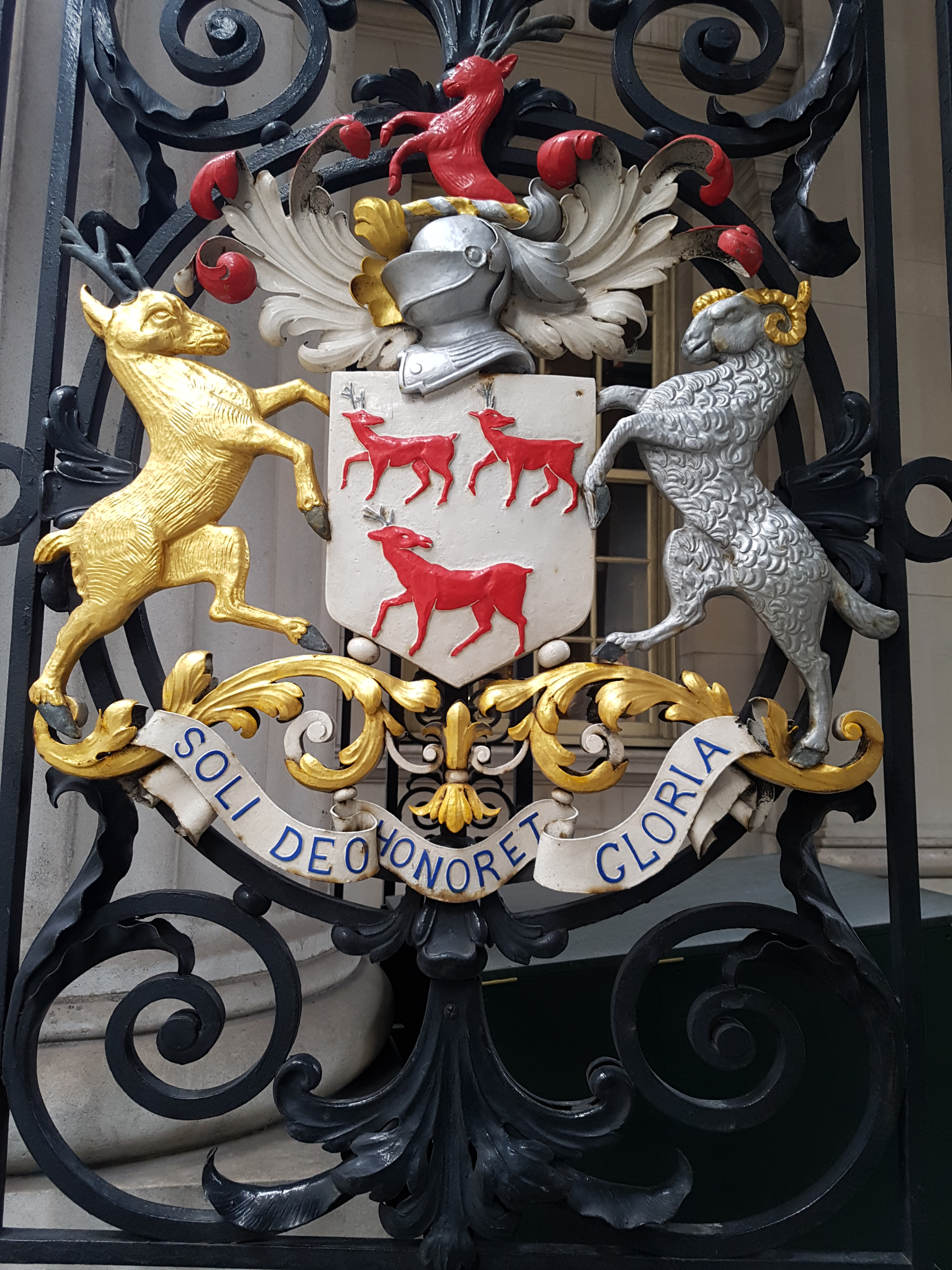
Coat of arms of the Worshipful Company of Leathersellers

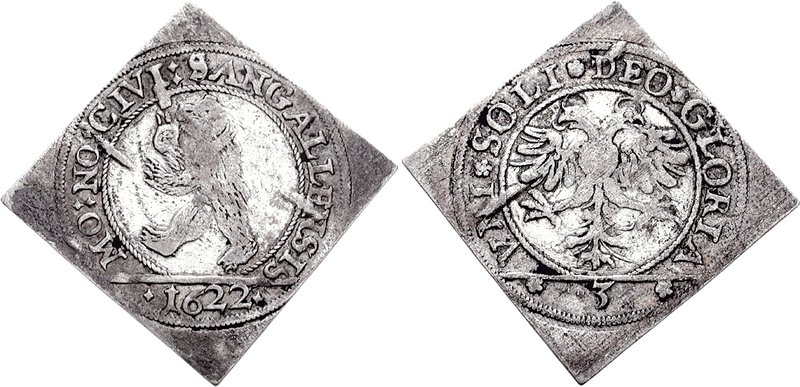
Soli Deo gloria on a 1622 coin from St. Gallen, Switzerland

.

Soli Deo Honor et Gloria is the motto of the Worshipful Company of Leathersellers, and appears on their gate at the entrance to St Helen's Place, City of London; the Worshipful Company of Drapers uses the same motto but in English as Unto God only be honour and glory.

Soli Deo gloria is the motto of the Brotherhood of Saint Gregory, a Christian Community of friars of the Episcopal Church founded within the Anglican Communion in 1969; of Wheaton Academy, a high school located in West Chicago, Illinois, which was founded in 1853; of Dallas Baptist University, Dallas, Texas, founded in 1898; of Concordia College (Moorhead, Minnesota); of Luther College, Decorah, Iowa; of Dordt University, Sioux Center, Iowa, founded in 1955; of the American Guild of Organists; of the Christ Presbyterian Academy in Nashville, Tennessee; of Ursuline High School, a Catholic high school located in Youngstown, Ohio which was founded in 1905; of Pittsburgh Theological Seminary, located in Pittsburgh, Pennsylvania, and of the Bishop's Stortford College, a British public school founded in 1868 in Bishop's Stortford, Hertfordshire. It is also imprinted on the South African 1 Rand coin.

== See also ==
- Ad maiorem Dei gloriam
- Apotheosis
- God Alone
- Subhan Allah
- Veneration
