= Arch Hurd =

Distribution of the GNU/Hurd operating system

- OS family: Unix-like (GNU/Hurd)
- Working state: Current
- Source model: Open source
- Latest release: 2022 / June 16, 2022; 4 years ago
- Marketing target: General purpose
- Update method: pacman
- Package manager: pacman
- Supported platforms: i686
- Kernel type: Microkernel (Hurd)
- Userland: GNU
- Default user interface: Bash
- License: GNU General Public License
- Official website: archhurd.org

Arch Hurd is a distribution of the GNU operating system with the GNU Hurd kernel (instead of the Linux kernel, which comes with the Arch Linux distribution).

The Arch Hurd project was founded on an Arch Linux forum thread in January 2010 and, after a few weeks with many contributions, progressed to the point where it could boot in a virtual machine. It aims to provide an Arch-like user environment (BSD-style init scripts, i686-optimised packages, use of the pacman package manager, rolling-release, and a KISS set up) on the Hurd which is stable enough for use.

== Development ==
Arch Hurd is currently not at a stable state. A downloadable image of the operating system does not exist, although such images were formerly hosted at Arch Hurd LiveCD. Although, re-uploads of the operating system can be found and a user can perform the chroot operation via Debian GNU/Hurd to make it usable.

Despite having a small development team, much progress has been made on Arch Hurd since its founding, such as booting on real hardware, packaging everything for a basic web server, and the production of an unofficial graphical LiveCD.

In June 2011, Arch Hurd announced successful integration of Device Driver Environment (DDE) — the framework for Linux drivers on Hurd, which improves the network hardware support in the distribution and makes it nearly usable.

As of December 2024, the official packages were last updated in May 2019, and the latest message from Arch Hurd's website is from May 25 2021. Development activity on the Git repository is still occurring.

== See also ==
- GNU Hurd
- Arch Linux
- Hurd variants
- Debian GNU/Hurd
