= CachyOS =

Arch-based Linux distribution

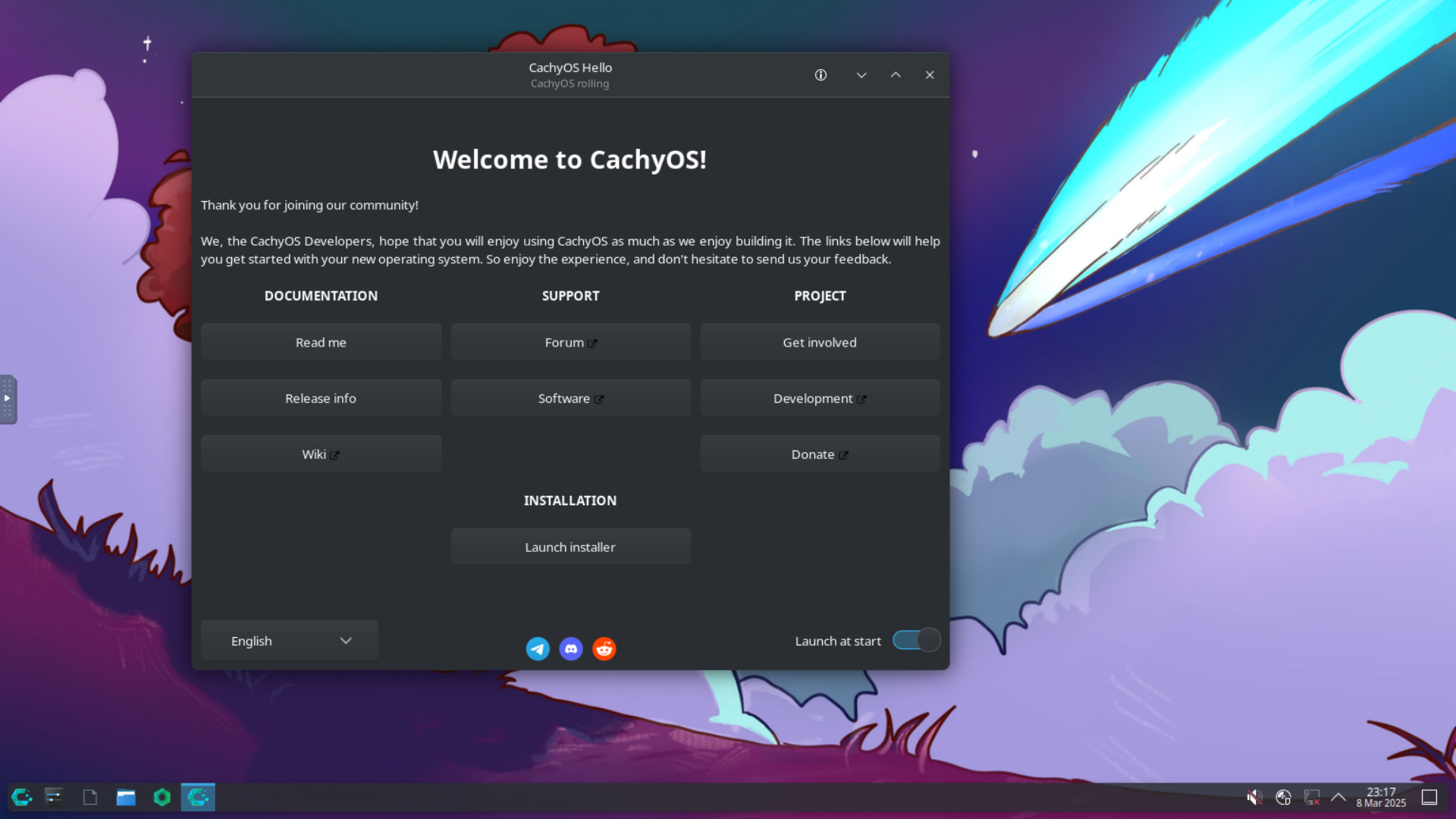
- CachyOS with KDE Plasma
- Developer: Peter Jung ("ptr1337"), Vladislav Nepogodin ("vnepogodin"), and community contributors
- OS family: Linux (Unix-like)
- Working state: Current
- Source model: Open source
- Initial release: July 2021; 5 years ago
- Latest release: 260809 / 9 August 2026; 3 months ago
- Marketing target: Desktop computing, gaming, and handheld gaming PCs
- Package manager: Pacman (with community AUR helpers)
- Supported platforms: x86-64
- Kernel type: Monolithic (Linux kernel, custom-patched)
- Userland: GNU
- Default user interface: KDE Plasma (default); GNOME, Xfce, Hyprland, COSMIC, and others available
- License: Free and open-source software (predominantly GPL and other free-software licenses)
- Official website: cachyos.org

CachyOS is a Linux distribution based on Arch Linux. It incorporates a graphical user interface and a set of performance modifications by default in an effort to create a more user friendly and responsive experience.

It shares the rolling release schedule and repositories of Arch Linux, and periodically releases updated installation media to help configure new features during setup. The distribution provides both a standard desktop edition and a handheld edition aimed at handheld game consoles.

== History ==
CachyOS was first released on July 3, 2021, by German developer Peter Jung (ptr1337), alongside co-developer Vladislav Nepogodin (vnepogodin). The project began when Jung was experimenting with and contributing to the cacULE scheduler alongside its developer, Hamad. They chose the name "CachyOS" as a reference to an earlier name for the scheduler.

CachyOS was featured in ComputerBase in November 2022 as an Arch Linux derivative with promising approaches.

During 2024, traffic for CachyOS installation increased sharply owing to its early discovery. According to PC Games Hardware, CachyOS achieved a 2.54 percent share of the Linux market on Steam in its first year. In July 2025, it became the most popular distribution on DistroWatch based on traffic to each distribution's page on the DistroWatch Website.

On December 3, 2025, CachyOS was granted a $250 per month sponsorship from Framework Computer as part of a batch of sponsorships towards open-source software, who recognized the distribution was excelling in benchmarks.

In January 2026, the Open Gaming Collective (OGC) formed to centralize efforts around critical software components employed for gaming on Linux based systems. CachyOS did not opt in to this collective, with Peter stating they did not see benefits that would flow through to CachyOS, and concerns around the initiative "rushing" to find new maintainers after removing a prominent member of their team.

As of March 2026, CachyOS is the most popular desktop distribution on ProtonDB, overtaking Arch Linux.

In late April 2026, CachyOS shipped with the Linux 7.0 kernel, which added additional performance improvements compared to Linux 6.19.

== Features ==
CachyOS recompiles Arch Linux packages for the x86-64-v3, x86-64-v4 and Zen 4+ architectures, delivering increased performance. Access to these packages is achieved through pacman repositories which can be added to an existing Arch Linux installation. CachyOS also provides access to the Arch User Repository (AUR). CachyOS additionally provides a graphical installer via Calamares to aid users in configuring their installation.

CachyOS provides a convenience installer for WinBoat that allows for easy installation of a lightweight Windows Virtual machine in a Docker or Podman container.

The distribution ships with a modified Linux kernel, named linux-cachyos, which integrates performance-based patches and alternative CPU schedulers such as the BORE and EEVDF to reduce system latency.

== Reception ==
CachyOS is often compared to Arch Linux and distributions based on it such as EndeavourOS, as well as gaming focused distributions such as Bazzite and SteamOS. Benchmarks have found measurable performance increments over other distributions in particular workloads.

The installation process has been described as easier and with more options for customization than the alternative methods presented in Arch Linux. The lack of an offline installer has been criticized, as successful installations are dependent on a reliable internet connection.

There has been a rise in popularity and recommendations of CachyOS on Reddit and in online forums discussing Linux distributions. Despite this, it has been recommended that users who are new to Linux should be cautious with selecting CachyOS, as Arch Linux based distributions often expect a degree of experience and familiarity with aspects of the ecosystem to troubleshoot underlying issues beyond what provided GUI helpers can achieve.

In the Linus Tech Tips "Linux 30 Day Challenge 2026" CachyOS was mentioned by all 3 competitors during their distro selection process and Luke Lafreniere chose to initially use CachyOS for his use in the challenge.

== See also ==
- List of Linux distributions § Pacman-based
- Arch Linux
