= Brotherhood of Saint Gregory =

Anglican community of friars

The Brotherhood of Saint Gregory is a community of friars within the Anglican Communion. The community's members, known as Gregorians, include clergy and laymen. Since 1987 there has also been a parallel order of sisters, the Sisters of Saint Gregory.

As a Christian community of the US Episcopal Church, the community is open to both married and unmarried men in the Episcopal Church, its communion partners, and the wider Anglican Communion. As in other orders and communities, members follow a common rule and regular discipline of prayer, study, and service to the church. This modern way of religious life is rooted in ancient sources such as Gregory the Great's Pastoral Care, Francis of Assisi's Rule for All the Faithful, and Francis de Sales' Introduction to the Devout Life. The community's motto is "Soli Deo gloria" ("To God alone be the glory"), and its aim is to follow Gregory the Great as "servants of the servants of God" in both church and society. The brothers work in diverse fields throughout the world, living with their families, singly, or in small groups. A member of the National Association of Episcopal Christian Communities, the community comes together twice a year for prayer and discussion.

The community was founded on 14 September 1969 (Holy Cross Day) in New York by Richard Thomas Biernacki, with the encouragement of a Roman Catholic order, the Sisters of the Visitation, and following consultation with other Episcopal communities. The community was formally recognized that same year by Bishop Horace Donegan of New York.

John Nidecker, a former White House speech writer, was a member later in his life. The community was a centerpiece of the award-winning documentary Changing Habits by Sara Needham. Ministries of the community have been the subject of local press reports in Chattanooga, Yonkers, and Maitland, New South Wales.

As of August, 2024, the community had 40 professed members and one postulant in discernment. The community elected its first Minister General, Ciarán Anthony DellaFera, when Richard Thomas, Founder, retired from the community’s leadership position after 55 years.
