= List of products based on FreeBSD =

There are many products based on FreeBSD. Information about these products and the version of FreeBSD they are based on is often difficult to come by, since this fact is not widely publicised.

== Libre software and hardware using free software ==
- BSDRP – BSD Router Project: Open Source Router Distribution
- CheriBSD – ARM-and-RISC-V-embedded-focused FreeBSD adaptation; capability-enabled, Unix-like operating system which takes advantage of CHERI capability hardware features on Arm's Morello platform and CHERI-RISC-V platforms.
- Chimera Linux – Linux distribution with FreeBSD userland.
- ClonOS – FreeBSD based distro for virtual hosting platform and appliance.
- Darwin – The UNIX-based, open-source foundation of macOS, iOS, iPadOS, watchOS, tvOS, visionOS, and bridgeOS, includes code from FreeBSD and the Mach kernel from Carnegie Mellon
- Debian GNU/kFreeBSD - [defunct] operating system with a FreeBSD kernel and Debian userland
- DesktopBSD – [defunct] KDE-based desktop-oriented distribution
- DragonFlyBSD – FreeBSD independent fork
- FreeSBIE – Live CD
- GhostBSD – GTK-based distribution, that defaults Xfce and MATE as GUI
- HardenedBSD – HardenedBSD is a security-enhanced fork of FreeBSD.
- helloSystem – helloSystem is a desktop system for creators with a focus on simplicity, elegance, and usability, especially for ex macOS users disappointed by Apple strategy
- iXsystems
  - TrueNAS storage appliances were based on FreeBSD 10.3
  - TrueNAS CORE (formerly known as FreeNAS) is based on FreeBSD, but is now abandoned. TrueNAS Scale, the successor of TrueNAS Core, is based on Debian Linux.
  - TrueOS – discontinued FreeBSD distribution aimed at the server market, previously a desktop distribution, abandoned to focus on TrueNAS Core.
- MidnightBSD — A GNUstep-based independent fork of FreeBSD for desktops, however installer is not graphical
- MyBee – Open source and free distribution for managing containers (FreeBSD jail) and cloud VMs (Bhyve) through a simplified API.
- m0n0wall – Embedded firewall software package
- NAS4Free – Open source storage platform
- NomadBSD – a persistent live system for USB flash drives, based on FreeBSD.
- OPNsense – Open source and free firewall, fork of pfSense and successor to m0n0wall
- pfSense – Open source and free network firewall distribution

== Proprietary software and hardware using proprietary software ==
- Beckhoff TwinCAT/BSD for Industrial PCs
- Blue Coat Systems network appliances
- Borderware appliances (firewall, VPN, Anti-SPAM, Web filter etc.) are based on a FreeBSD kernel
- Check Point IPSO security appliances
- Citrix Systems Netscaler application delivery software is based on FreeBSD
- Coyote Point GX-series web acceleration and load balancer appliances
- Dell Compellent enterprise storage systems (all 64-bit versions)
- Hobnob WirelessWAN
- IronPort AsyncOS is based on a FreeBSD kernel
- Isilon Systems' OneFS, the operating system used on Isilon IQ-series clustered storage systems
- Juniper Networks Junos
  - Junos prior to 5.0 was based on FreeBSD 2.2.6
  - Junos between 5.0 and 7.2 (inclusive) is based on FreeBSD 4.2
  - Junos 7.3 and higher is based on FreeBSD 4.10
  - Junos 8.5 is based on FreeBSD 6.1
  - Junos 15.1 is based on FreeBSD 10
  - Junos 18.1 is based on FreeBSD 11
- KACE Networks's KBOX 1000 & 2000 Series Appliances and the Virtual KBOX Appliance
- Lynx Software Technologies LynxOS, uses FreeBSD's networking stack
- McAfee SecurOS, used in e.g. Firewall Enterprise (aka Sidewinder)
- NetApp filers based on Data ONTAP
- Netflix Open Connect appliances
- Panasas parallel network storage systems
- Panasonic uses FreeBSD in their Viera TV receivers
- QNAP's QES operating system
- Sandvine's network policy control products
- Silicon Graphics International uses FreeBSD in their ArcFiniti MAID disk arrays, formerly manufactured by COPAN.
- Sony Computer Entertainment's PlayStation 3, PlayStation 4 and PlayStation Vita.
- Sophos Email Appliance
- Spectra Logic nTier Verde backup appliances
- Symmetricom Timing Solutions
- The Weather Channel's IntelliStar local forecast computer
- Xinuos OpenServer 10

== See also ==
- List of BSD operating systems
