= List of BSD operating systems =

There are several Unix-like operating systems under active development that are descended from the Berkeley Software Distribution, a series of UNIX variants developed by the Computer Systems Research Group at the University of California, Berkeley.

== History ==
BSD was originally derived from Unix, using the complete source code for Sixth Edition Unix for the PDP-11 from Bell Labs as a starting point for the First Berkeley Software Distribution, or 1BSD. A series of updated versions for the PDP-11 followed (the 2.xBSD releases). A 32-bit version for the VAX platform was released as 3BSD, and the 4.xBSD series added many new features, including TCP/IP networking.

For many years, the primary developer and project leader was Bill Joy, who was a graduate student at the time; funding for this project was provided by DARPA. DARPA was interested in obtaining a programming platform and programmer's interface which would provide a robust, general purpose, time-sharing computing platform which would not become obsolete every time computing hardware was or is replaced. Such an operating system would allow US Department of Defense software, especially for intricate, long-term finance and logistics operations, to be quickly ported to new hardware as it became available.

As time went on, code was later ported both from and to Unix System III and still later Unix System V. Unix System V Revision 4 (SVR4), released circa 1992, contained much code which was ported from BSD version up to and including 4.3BSD.

== BSD distributions ==
Since the early 2000s, BSD has grown into a family of derivatives—each refining, removing, or adding features while staying largely compatible with FreeBSD, NetBSD, or OpenBSD.

=== FreeBSD-based ===
FreeBSD is a free Unix-like operating system descended from AT&T UNIX via the Berkeley Software Distribution (BSD). FreeBSD currently has more than 200 active developers and thousands of contributors. Other notable derivatives include DragonFly BSD, which was forked from FreeBSD 4.8, and Apple Inc.'s macOS, with its Darwin base including a large amount of code derived from FreeBSD.

Name	Description
ClonOS	Offers a complete web UI for easily controlling, deploying and managing FreeBSD jails, containers and Bhyve/Xen hypervisor virtual environments
DragonFly BSD	Originally forked from FreeBSD 4.8, now developed in a different direction
TrueNAS Core	Previously known as FreeNAS
GhostBSD	GhostBSD is a FreeBSD OS distro oriented for desktops and laptops. Its goal is to combine the stability and security of FreeBSD with OpenRC, OS packages and Mate graphical user interface. GhostBSD comes as livecd for users to test before installing.
HardenedBSD	HardenedBSD is a security-enhanced fork of FreeBSD. The project is implementing exploit mitigation and security technologies on top of FreeBSD.
helloSystem	A desktop system for creators that focuses on simplicity, elegance, and usability
Junos OS	For Juniper routers
MidnightBSD	Midnight BSD forked from FreeBSD 6.1 Beta.
XigmaNAS	Previously known as NAS4Free, is a network-attached storage (NAS) server software. It is a continuation of the original FreeNAS code.
NomadBSD	Persistent live system for USB flash drives
OPNsense	OPNsense is a FreeBSD-based firewall tailored for use as a firewall and router that was forked from pfSense.
pfSense	pfSense is a FreeBSD-based firewall tailored for use as a firewall and router.
CellOS	The PlayStation 3 operating system
Orbis OS	The PlayStation 4 operating system
Zrouter	FreeBSD based firmware for embedded devices
ULBSD	ULBSD is a Unix-like, desktop-oriented operating system based on FreeBSD. It aims to be easy to install and ready-to-use immediately by providing pre-installed graphical KDE6 user desktop environment.
AskoziaPBX	Discontinued
BSDBox	Discontinued
BSDeviant	Discontinued
BSDLive	Discontinued
Bzerk CD	Discontinued
ClosedBSD	Discontinued
DesktopBSD	Discontinued. Was a desktop-oriented FreeBSD variant using K Desktop Environment 3.5.
EclipseBSD	Discontinued
Evoke	Discontinued. Formerly DamnSmallBSD; a small live FreeBSD environment geared toward developers and system administrators.
FenestrOS BSD	Discontinued
FreeBSDLive	Discontinued
FreeBSD LiveCD	Discontinued
FreeSBIE	Discontinued
Frenzy Live CD	Discontinued. A "portable system administrator toolkit". It generally contains software for hardware tests, file system check, security check and network setup and analysis.
FuryBSD	Discontinued in 2020. Paid homage to desktop BSD projects of the past like PC-BSD and TrueOS with its graphical interface and adds additional tools like a live, hybrid USB / DVD image.
Debian GNU/kFreeBSD	Discontinued
Ging	Discontinued
Gentoo/FreeBSD	Discontinued. Gentoo/*BSD was a subproject to port Gentoo features such as Portage to the FreeBSD operating system.
GuLIC-BSD	Discontinued
HamFreeSBIE	Discontinued
HeX	Discontinued
IronPort AsyncOS	Discontinued. security appliances
miniBSD	Discontinued
m0n0wall	Discontinued. Successor is OPNsense. m0n0wall was an embedded firewall distribution of FreeBSD, one of the BSD operating system descendants. It provided a small image which can be put on Compact Flash cards as well as on CDROMs and hard disks. It ran on a number of embedded platforms and generic PCs.
NetBoz	Discontinued
Nokia IPSO	Discontinued. Nokia IP security appliances
PacBSD	Discontinued. A lightweight operating system that aimed to bring the flexibility and philosophy of Arch Linux to BSD-based operating systems. The Project has been inactive since 2017.
Paxym	Discontinued. FreeBSD for Cavium Networks OCTEON
PicoBSD	Discontinued
RelaxBSD	Discontinued
RoFreeSBIE	Discontinued
Snarl	Discontinued
The Dark Star	Discontinued
TheWall	Discontinued
ThinBSD	Discontinued
Triance OS	Discontinued
TrueBSD	Discontinued
TrueOS	Discontinued. TrueOS (formerly PC/BSD) was a Unix-like, desktop-oriented operating system based on FreeBSD based on ZFS boot-environments, Lumina (desktop environment), and the sysadm administration framework; reinvented as Trident OS on top of Void Linux, retained many BSD aesthetics.
TrustedBSD	Discontinued. Many of its extensions were integrated into FreeBSD. Only activity on trustedbsd-discuss mailing list is spam (as of 2020-12-22).
WarBSD	Discontinued
WiBSD	Discontinued
WiFiBSD	Discontinued
XORP	Discontinued
BSDTahoe	BSD 4.3 Tahoe for VAX
ravynOS (formerly airyxOS)	ravynOS was a FreeBSD-based OS aimed at providing "the finesse of macOS", however it has moved to a Darwin base instead.

=== NetBSD-based ===
NetBSD is a freely redistributable, open source version of the Unix-derivative Berkeley Software Distribution (BSD) computer operating system. It was the second open source BSD descendant to be formally released, after 386BSD, and continues to be actively developed. Noted for its portability and quality of design and implementation, it is often used in embedded systems and as a starting point for the porting of other operating systems to new computer architectures.

Name	Description
BlackBSD	Discontinued. BlackBSD was a NetBSD-based Live CD, with security tools on it and fluxbox as a window manager
EdgeBSD	Discontinued. NetBSD fork with main goal to be more modern in some aspects than NetBSD itself. Its most noticeable differences were back-committed to the main project.
fdgw	fdgw is a tool kit to build a minimal NetBSD bootable disk, with a primary focus on routers.
Force10 Networks FTOS	Powerful and robust operating system that runs on Force10 TeraScale E-Series switches/routers.
SEIL/SMFv2	The software framework used by IIJ's SEIL/X CPE routers, built on NetBSD.
g4u	NetBSD-based bootfloppy/CD-ROM that allows easy cloning of PC harddisks.
Debian GNU/NetBSD	Debian GNU/NetBSD was a project to combine Debian with the kernel of NetBSD. It was abandoned in 2002 and has not seen active maintenance ever since.
Gentoo/NetBSD	Discontinued. Gentoo/*BSD was a subproject to port Gentoo features such as Portage to the NetBSD operating system.
irBSD	Discontinued. irBSD was a digital forensics kit based on the NetBSD operating system, designed for cryptography, penetration testing, data recovery, reverse engineering, privacy protection and other security tasks.
Jibbed	Live CD based on NetBSD
NetBSD/i386 Firewall	Inactive. A free firewall solution based on NetBSD and targeting i386 devices.
OS108	OS108 is a desktop-oriented operating system based on NetBSD.
PolyBSD / pocketSAN	Multipurpose framework for building embedded systems based on NetBSD.
SEOS	The operating system for the Ericsson SmartEdge router series
smolBSD	System creation tool based on NetBSD, primarily aimed at building modern, lightweight, fast micro VMs.

=== OpenBSD-based ===
OpenBSD is a Unix-like computer operating system descended from Berkeley Software Distribution (BSD), a Unix derivative developed at the University of California, Berkeley. It was forked from NetBSD in 1995. OpenBSD includes a number of security features absent or optional in other operating systems and has a tradition of developers auditing the source code for software bugs and security problems.

Name	Description
ÆrieBSD	OpenBSD fork which tends to be free from GPL-licensed software.
adJ	Distribution of OpenBSD for Spanish speakers, since 2005 new versions are released around 3 months after OpenBSD's releases, source in GitHub, to learn how to install there is a challenge with badge on P2PU
Anonym.OS	Discontinued.
Bitrig	Discontinued. Was an OpenBSD fork with main goal to be more modern in some aspects than OpenBSD.
BowlFish	Customized OpenBSD installation script for embedded systems, intended to make OpenBSD fit into small media like compact flash cards.
BSDanywhere	Live CD featuring the Enlightenment DR17 window manager
ComixWall	A firewall with UTM features. Discontinued 2009 in place for UTMFW
ekkoBSD	ekkoBSD was a Unix-like operating system based on OpenBSD 3.3, also incorporating code from other BSD-like operating systems. Its focus was on security and easy administration.
EmBSD	
FabBSD	OpenBSD fork with main application in CNC field. It is almost inactive.
FuguIta	Providing both LiveDVD and LiveUSB for i386/amd64/arm64. Highly customizable by user. Tracking errata on OpenBSD-stable.
Gentoo/OpenBSD	Gentoo/*BSD was a subproject to port Gentoo features such as Portage to the OpenBSD operating system.
HyperbolaBSD	Under development. Lightweight distribution focused on freedom.
LibertyBSD	Discontinued. Fork of OpenBSD with all non-free binaries removed.
LiveCD OpenBSD	LiveCD OpenBSD is sister project of LiveUSB-OpenBSD and this gives users a Live CD/DVD bootable distribution where the user gets to experience OpenBSD without installing to disk. There are 3 flavors, one with XFCE, one with MATE desktop and one with KDE.
LiveUSB OpenBSD	LiveUSB OpenBSD is a project started around 2009 for creating OpenBSD based bootable USB flash images. There are 3 variants, one with Gnome, a minimal text only version and an XFCE desktop image.
MarBSD	LiveCD of OpenBSD
MicroBSD	Fork of the UNIX-like BSD operating system descendant OpenBSD 3.0, begun in July 2002. The project's objective to produce a free and fully secure, complete system, but with a small footprint.
MirOS BSD	Core system based mostly on OpenBSD and some NetBSD code for 32-bit i386 and SPARC, updated via infrequent snapshots and by following "current". Additional packages via MirPorts and pkgsrc are no longer updated.
OliveBSD	Was a live CD originally based on OpenBSD 3.8
PsygNAT	Firewall and NAT router tool
Quetzal	Was a live DVD/CD system, based on OpenBSD
SecBSD	OS for cybersecurity professionals, ethical hackers, and penetration testers. Comparable to Kali Linux.
SONaFR	SONaFR is a small system with router/NAT/firewalling capabilities that fits on a single floppy.
UTMFW	Successor of ComixWall, a firewall with UTM features

=== Legacy BSD distributions ===
Name	Description
RetroBSD	RetroBSD is a port of 2.11BSD Unix intended for embedded systems with fixed memory mapping. The current target is the Microchip PIC32MX microcontroller with 128 kbytes of RAM and 512 kbytes of Flash.
DiscoBSD	DiscoBSD is an independent continuation of RetroBSD that also supports STM32F4 ARM devices.
LiteBSD	LiteBSD is a port of 4.4BSD Unix adapted for embedded systems with memory mapping with paging support. The current target is the Microchip PIC32MZ microcontroller.

== BSD-like Systems ==
There are various operating systems, particularly Linux distributions that attempt to imitate the design of BSD, but do not use the code base of any BSD Operating System.

Name	Description
Void Linux	Void Linux is a Linux distribution created in 2008 by Juan Romero Pardines, a former developer of NetBSD. It uses its own independent package manager, XBPS. It also has elements inspired by NetBSD, such as xbps-src—a source package management system inspired by pkgsrc, an adaption of NetBSD's wtf utility, and also uses runit as its init system instead of systemd.
CRUX	CRUX is a Linux distribution mainly targeted at expert computer users. It uses BSD-style initscripts and utilizes a ports system similar to a BSD-based operating system.
Chimera Linux	Chimera Linux is a Linux distribution that uses musl libc and core utilities based on FreeBSD.
Sabotage Linux	Sabotage is an experimental Linux distribution based on musl libc and busybox. It uses NetBSD curses and has a lightweight multithreaded package and build manager, named butch.

== See also ==
- Comparison of BSD operating systems
- Commercial products based on FreeBSD
