= ADJ =

ADJ or Adj may refer to:

- ADJ, in linguistics, glossing abbreviation for adjective, a part of speech
- AdJ, software
- Adjugate (or classical adjoint) of a matrix in mathematics
- Adjukru language, ISO-639-3 code
- Amman Civil Airport in Amman Governorate, Jordan (IATA airport code ADJ)

== See also ==
- AD (disambiguation)
- DJ (disambiguation)
- Adjacent (disambiguation)
- Adjustment (disambiguation)
