= Kbox =

Kbox or K-box may refer to:

== Products ==
- kBox, a flywheel training device
- K-box, an audio speaker
- KBOX, a brand of computer products by KACE Networks; See List of products based on FreeBSD

== Radio stations ==
- KBOX, a Lompoc, California, US radio station
- KNGO, a radio station (1480 AM) licensed to serve Dallas, Texas, United States, which held the call sign KBOX from 1958 to 1989
