= Sweet Thing =

Sweet Thing(s) may refer to:

== Music ==
- Sweet Thing (band), a Canadian pop rock group
- Clydie King & The Sweet Things

=== Albums ===
- Sweet Thing (album), a 1997 album by Boney James
- Sweet Things (Georgie Fame album), a 1966 album by Georgie Fame
- Sweet Things (ThaMuseMeant album), an album by ThaMuseMeant

=== Songs ===
- "Sweet Thing" (David Bowie song), 1974
- "Sweet Thing" (Horse McDonald song), 1990
- "Sweet Thing" (Keith Urban song), 2008
- "Sweet Thing" (Mick Jagger song), 1992
- "Sweet Thing" (Rufus song), 1975, also covered by Mary J. Blige
- "Sweet Thing" (Van Morrison song), 1968
- "Sweet Thing", by Yazoo from You and Me Both
- "Sweet Things", song by Indiana Gregg
- "Sweet Things", song by Tiësto from Elements of Life
- "Sweet Thang", a song by Childish Gambino from Atavista
- "Sweet Thang", a song by Nat Stuckey, also covered by Ernest Tubb, Loretta Lynn, Gene Summers

== See also ==
- Sweetest Thing (disambiguation)
- Sweet Sticky Thing, the name of a popular song by funk band Ohio Players
- Sweet Young Thing, a song by the Monkees
