= NextBSD =

Operating system

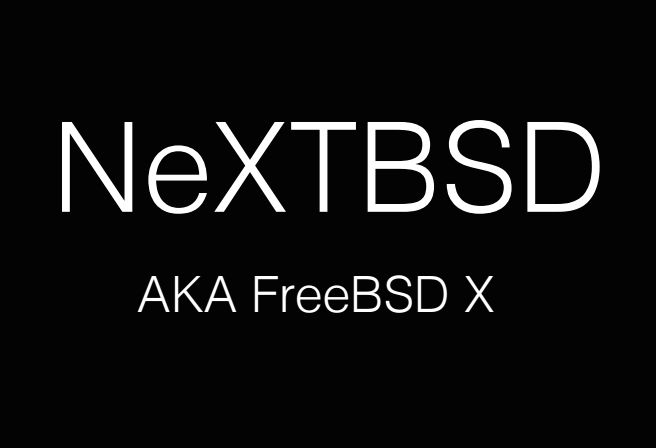
- Developer: Jordan Hubbard, Kip Macy, Joe Maloney
- Written in: C
- OS family: Unix
- Working state: Current
- Source model: Open source
- Initial release: 2015; 11 years ago
- Latest release: Beta / June 14, 2026; 4 months ago
- Repository: github.com/nextbsd
- Available in: English
- Supported platforms: Intel 80386
- Kernel type: Monolithic
- Userland: NextBSD
- Default user interface: Command-line interface
- License: BSD licenses
- Official website: nextbsd.org

NextBSD is a fork of the FreeBSD operating system. As of 2019 the website seems defunct, and the later commits on GitHub date from October 2019. The Wayback Machine captures of the website after 2016-12-15 are domain squatter pages and as of 2021-03-17 the site is redirecting to a fake "Apple Support" page.

== Features ==
The basic features of launchd, notifyd, asld, and libdispatch work.

These can be installed by cloning the NextBSD repository from GitHub, building GENERIC or MACHTEST kernels, installing a new world on an existing 10.x or CURRENT system, and then following the instructions in the README.

Launchd will start the initial jobs that are part of the repo now.

== Planned Features ==
The project refers to an installer as the first planned milestone on their website.

Future plans include convert to rc and tying notifyd in to potential consumers.

== History ==
NeXTBSD was announced by Jordan Hubbard and Kip Macy in August 2015 at the Bay Area FreeBSD Users Group (BAFUG).

== Relationship to FreeBSD ==
NeXTBSD is based on the FreeBSD-CURRENT kernel while adding in Mach IPC, Libdispatch, notifyd, asld, launchd, and other components derived from Darwin, Apple's open-source code for macOS.

== Technology ==
=== Basic Architecture ===
- FreeBSD-current kernel + Mach IPC
- Common Object Runtime (create/delete/retain/release)
- Libdispatch / ASL / Libnotify
- launchd
  - launchctl
    - json config files
  - legacy rc system
  - cooperating daemons

== Mach Kernel Abstractions ==
=== Tasks ===
The units of resource ownership; each task consists of a virtual address space, a port right namespace, and one or more threads. (Implemented as an extension to a process.)

=== Threads ===
The units of CPU execution within a task. Simple extension to kthreads.

=== Address space ===
In conjunction with memory managers, Mach implements the notion of a sparse virtual address space and shared memory. (No modifications)

=== Memory objects ===
The internal units of memory management. Memory objects include named entries and regions; they are representations of potentially persistent data that may be mapped into address spaces. (Unsupported)

=== Ports ===
Secure, simplex communication channels, accessible only via send and receive capabilities (known as port rights).

=== IPC ===
Message queues, remote procedure calls, notifications, semaphores, and lock sets. (Mach semaphores and lock sets are not supported).

=== Time ===
Clocks, timers, and waiting - (rudimentary shims).

=== Standards adherence ===
Current BSD operating system variants support many of the common IEEE, ANSI, ISO, and POSIX standards, while retaining most of the traditional BSD behavior. Like AT&T Unix, the BSD kernel is monolithic, meaning that device drivers in the kernel run in privileged mode, as part of the core of the operating system.

A selection of significant Unix versions and Unix-like operating systems that descend from BSD includes:

- FreeBSD, an open source general purpose operating system.
  - NeXT NEXTSTEP and OPENSTEP, based on the Mach kernel and 4BSD; the ancestor of Mac OS X (macOS)
    - Apple Inc.'s Darwin, the core of macOS and iOS; built on the XNU kernel (part Mach, part FreeBSD, part Apple-derived code) and a userland much of which comes from FreeBSD

== See also ==
- FreeBSD
- macOS
- Darwin
- RavynOS
- BSD Daemon
- BSD licenses
- Comparison of BSD operating systems
- List of BSD operating systems

== Bibliography ==
- Marshall K. McKusick, Keith Bostic, Michael J. Karels, John S. Quartermain, The Design and Implementation of the 4.4BSD Operating System (Addison Wesley, 1996; ISBN 978-0-201-54979-9)
- Marshall K. McKusick, George V. Neville-Neil, The Design and Implementation of the FreeBSD Operating System (Addison Wesley, August 2, 2004; ISBN 978-0-201-70245-3)
- Samuel J. Leffler, Marshall K. McKusick, Michael J. Karels, John S. Quarterman, The Design and Implementation of the 4.3BSD UNIX Operating System (Addison Wesley, November 1989; ISBN 978-0-201-06196-3)
- McKusick, Marshall Kirk (1999). "Twenty Years of Berkeley Unix – From AT&T-Owned to Freely Redistributable". In DiBona, Chris; Ockman, Sam; Stone, Mark (eds.). Open Sources: Voices from the Revolution. O'Reilly. ISBN 978-1-56592-582-3.
- Peter H. Salus, The Daemon, the GNU & The Penguin (Reed Media Services, September 1, 2008; ISBN 978-0-9790342-3-7)
- Peter H. Salus, A Quarter Century of UNIX (Addison Wesley, June 1, 1994; ISBN 978-0-201-54777-1)
- Peter H. Salus, Casting the Net (Addison-Wesley, March 1995; ISBN 978-0-201-87674-1)
