= Comparison of BSD operating systems =

There are a number of Unix-like operating systems based on or descended from the Berkeley Software Distribution (BSD) series of Unix variant options. The three most notable descendants in current use are FreeBSD, OpenBSD, and NetBSD. Both NetBSD and FreeBSD started life in 1993, initially derived from 386BSD, but in 1994 migrated to a 4.4BSD-Lite code base. OpenBSD was forked from NetBSD in 1995. Other notable derivatives include DragonFly BSD, which was forked from FreeBSD 4.8 in June of 2003.

Most of the current BSD operating systems are open source and available for download, free of charge, under the BSD License. They also generally use a monolithic kernel architecture, apart from DragonFly BSD which feature hybrid kernels. The various open source BSD projects generally develop the kernel and userland programs and libraries together, the source code being managed using a single central source repository.

BSD has also been used as a basis for several proprietary versions of UNIX, such as Apple Inc.'s MacOS, Sun's SunOS, Sequent's Dynix, NeXT's NeXTSTEP, DEC's Ultrix and OSF/1 AXP (which became the now discontinued Tru64 UNIX).

== Aims and philosophies ==
=== FreeBSD ===
FreeBSD aims to make an operating system usable for any purpose. It is intended to run a wide variety of applications, be easy to use, contain cutting-edge features, and be highly scalable, including for network servers with very high loads. FreeBSD is free software, and the project prefers the FreeBSD license. However, they sometimes accept non-disclosure agreements (NDAs) and include a limited number of nonfree hardware abstraction layer (HAL) modules for specific device drivers in their source tree, to support the hardware of companies who do not provide purely libre drivers (such as HALs to program software-defined radios so that vendors do not share their nonfree algorithms).

To maintain a high level of quality and provide good support for "production quality commercial off-the-shelf (COTS) workstation, server, and high-end embedded systems", FreeBSD focuses on a narrow set of architectures. A significant focus of development since 2000 has been fine-grained locking and symmetric multiprocessing (SMP) scalability. From 2007 on, most of the kernel was fine-locked and scaling improvements started to be seen. Other recent work includes Common Criteria security functionality, such as mandatory access control and security event audit support.

Derivatives:

- TrueNAS/FreeNAS – a network-attached storage (NAS) operating system based on FreeBSD.
- FuryBSD – a FreeBSD-based operating system, founded after Project Trident decided to build on Void Linux instead of TrueOS. Discontinued in October 2020.
- GhostBSD – a FreeBSD-based operating system that uses the MATE desktop environment and aims to be user-friendly.
- MidnightBSD – a FreeBSD-based OS with XFCE based Desktop Environment.
- Junos OS – a FreeBSD-based nonfree operating system distributed with Juniper Networks hardware.
- NomadBSD – a persistent live system for USB flash drives, based on FreeBSD.
- ClonOS – virtual hosting platform/appliance based on FreeBSD.
- pfSense – an open source firewall/router computer software distribution based on FreeBSD.
- OPNsense – an open source firewall/router computer software distribution based on FreeBSD.
- BSDRP – BSD Router Project: Open Source Router Distribution based on FreeBSD.
- HardenedBSD – HardenedBSD is a security-enhanced fork of FreeBSD.
- StarBSD – is a Unix-like, server-oriented operating system based on FreeBSD for Mission-Critical Enterprise Environment.
- TrueOS (previously PC-BSD) – a FreeBSD based server operating system, previously a desktop operating system. The project was officially discontinued in May 2020.
- XigmaNAS – a network-attached storage (NAS) server software with a dedicated management web interface.
- helloSystem – a GUI-focused system with a macOS interface.
- CheriBSD – adapted to support CHERI-MIPS, CHERI-RISC-V, and Arm Morello ISAs.

=== NetBSD ===
NetBSD aims to provide a freely redistributable operating system that professionals, hobbyists, and researchers can use in any manner they wish. The main focus is portability, through the use of clear distinctions between machine-dependent and machine-independent code. It runs on a wide variety of 32-bit and 64-bit CPU architectures and hardware platforms, and is intended to interoperate well with other operating systems.

NetBSD emphasizes correct design, stability, and efficiency. Where practical, close compliance with open API and protocol standards is also emphasized. A TCP/IP stack, combined with a small footprint, make NetBSD suited to be embedded in networking applications, as well as to revive vintage hardware.

In June 2008, the NetBSD Foundation moved to a 2-clause BSD license, citing changes at UCB and industry applicability.

Projects spawned by NetBSD include NPF, Rump kernels, busdma, pkgsrc and NVMM.

Derivatives:

- Force10 Networks FTOS– Powerful and robust operating system that runs on Force10 TeraScale E-Series switches and routers.
- SEIL/SMFv2– The system management framework used by IIJ's SEIL/X CPE routers, built on NetBSD.
- fdgw – fdgw is a tool kit to build a minimal NetBSD bootable disk, with a primary focus on routers.
- g4u – NetBSD based boot floppy/CD-ROM that allows easy cloning of PC hard drives.
- OS108 – system with graphical desktop environment based on NetBSD.
- polyBSD/pocketSAN – Multipurpose framework for building embedded SAN and VPN appliances based on NetBSD.
- smolBSD – Tiny BSD system creation tool, primarily aimed at building modern, lightweight, fast micro VMs.

=== OpenBSD ===
OpenBSD is a security-focused BSD known for its developers' insistence on extensive, ongoing code auditing for security and correct functionality, a "secure by default" philosophy, good documentation, and adherence to strictly open source licensing. The system incorporates numerous security features that are absent or optional in other versions of BSD. The OpenBSD policy on openness extends to hardware documentation and drivers, since without these, there can be no trust in the correct operation of the kernel and its security, and vendor software bugs would be hard to resolve.

OpenBSD emphasizes very high standards in all areas. Security policies include disabling all non-essential services and having sane initial settings; and integrated cryptography (originally made easier due to relaxed Canadian export laws relative to the United States), full public disclosure of all security flaws discovered; thoroughly auditing code for bugs and security issues; various security features, including the W^X page protection technology and heavy use of randomization to mitigate attacks. Coding approaches include an emphasis on searching for similar issues throughout the code base if any code issue is identified. Concerning software freedom, OpenBSD prefers the BSD or ISC license, with the GPL acceptable only for existing software which is impractical to replace, such as the GNU Compiler Collection. NDAs are never considered acceptable. In common with its parent, NetBSD, OpenBSD strives to run on a wide variety of hardware. Where licenses or code quality conflict with OpenBSD's philosophy, the OpenBSD team has re-implemented major pieces of software from scratch, which have often become the standard used within other versions of BSD. Examples include the pf packet filter, new privilege separation techniques used to safeguard tools such as tcpdump and tmux, much of the OpenSSH codebase, and replacing GPL licensed tools such as diff, grep and pkg-config with ISC or BSD licensed equivalents.

OpenBSD prominently notes the success of its security approach on its website home page. As of July 2024, only two remotely exploitable vulnerabilities have ever been found in its default install (an OpenSSH vulnerability found in 2002, and a remote network vulnerability found in 2007) in a period of almost 22 years. According to OpenBSD expert Michael W. Lucas, OpenBSD "is widely regarded as the most secure operating system available anywhere, under any licensing terms."

OpenBSD has spawned numerous child projects such as OpenSSH, OpenNTPD, OpenBGPD, OpenSMTPD, PF, CARP, and LibreSSL. Many of these are designed to replace restricted alternatives.

Derivatives:

- LibertyBSD – Aimed to be a 'deblobbed' version of OpenBSD. There are a number of reasons as to why blobs can be problematic, according to the project. LibertyBSD began going through the process to become Free Software Foundation FSDG certified, but ultimately never was accepted. LibertyBSD is no longer actively developed, and the project page directs people instead to HyperbolaBSD.
- Isotop, a French project aiming to adapt OpenBSD to desktops and laptops, using xfce then dwm.
- fuguita – a live system based on OpenBSD for i386, amd64, and arm64

=== DragonFly BSD ===
DragonFly BSD aims to be inherently easy to understand and develop for multi-processor infrastructures. The main goal of the project, forked from FreeBSD 4.8, is to radically change the kernel architecture, introducing microkernel-like message passing which will enhance scaling and reliability on symmetric multiprocessing (SMP) platforms while also being applicable to NUMA and clustered systems. The long-term goal is to provide a transparent single system image in clustered environments. DragonFly BSD originally supported both the IA-32 and x86-64 platforms, however support for IA-32 was dropped in version 4.0. Matthew Dillon, the founder of DragonFly BSD, believes supporting fewer platforms makes it easier for a project to do a proper, ground-up symmetric multiprocessing implementation.

== Popularity ==
Bar chart showing the proportion of users of each BSD variant from a BSD usage survey from September 2005.

In September 2005, the BSD Certification Group, after advertising on a number of mailing lists, surveyed 4,330 BSD users, 3,958 of whom took the survey in English, to assess the relative popularity of the various BSD operating systems. About 77% of respondents used FreeBSD, 33% used OpenBSD, 16% used NetBSD, 2.6% used Dragonfly, and 6.6% used other (potentially non-BSD) systems. Other languages offered were Brazilian Portuguese and Portuguese, German, Italian, and Polish. Note that there was no control group or pre-screening of the survey takers. Those who checked "Other" were asked to specify that operating system.

Because survey takers were permitted to select more than one answer, the percentages shown in the graph, which are out of the number survey of participants, add up to greater than 100%. If a survey taker filled in more than one choice for "other", this is still only counted as one vote for other on this chart.

Another attempt to profile worldwide BSD usage is the *BSDstats Project, whose primary goal is to demonstrate to hardware vendors the penetration of BSD and viability of hardware drivers for the operating system. The project collects data monthly from any BSD system administrators willing to participate, and currently records the BSD market share of participating FreeBSD, OpenBSD, NetBSD, DragonflyBSD, Debian GNU/kFreeBSD, TrueOS, and MirBSD systems.

In 2020, a new independent project was introduced to collect statistics with the goal of significantly increasing the number of observed parameters.

DistroWatch, well known in the Linux community and often used as a rough guide to free operating system popularity, publishes page hits for each of the Linux distributions and other operating systems it covers. As of 27 March 2020, using a data span of the last six months it placed FreeBSD in 21st place with 452 hits per day, GhostBSD in 51st place with 243 hits, TrueOS in 54th place with 182 hits per day, DragonflyBSD in 75th place with 180 hits, OpenBSD in 80th place with 169 hits per day and NetBSD in 109th place with 105 hits per day.

== Names, logos, slogans ==
The names FreeBSD and OpenBSD are references to software freedom: both in cost and open source. NetBSD's name is a tribute to the Internet, which brought the original developers together.

The first BSD mascot was the BSD daemon, named after a common type of Unix software program, a daemon. FreeBSD still uses the image, a red cartoon daemon named Beastie, wielding a pitchfork, as its mascot today. In 2005, after a competition, a stylized version of Beastie's head designed and drawn by Anton Gural was chosen as the FreeBSD logo. The FreeBSD slogan is "The Power to Serve."

The NetBSD flag, designed in 2004 by Grant Bissett, is inspired by the original NetBSD logo, designed in 1994 by Shawn Mueller, portraying a number of BSD daemons raising a flag on top of a mound of computer equipment. This was based on a World War II photograph, Raising the Flag on Iwo Jima. The Board of Directors of The NetBSD Foundation believed this was too complicated, too hard to reproduce and had negative cultural ramifications and was thus not a suitable image for NetBSD in the corporate world. The new, simpler flag design replaced this. The NetBSD slogan is "Of course it runs NetBSD", referring to the operating system's portability.

Originally, OpenBSD used the BSD daemon as a mascot, sometimes with an added halo as a distinguishing mark, but OpenBSD later replaced its BSD daemon with Puffy. Although Puffy is usually referred to as a pufferfish, the spikes on the cartoon images give him a closer likeness to the porcupinefish. The logo is a reference to the fish's defensive capabilities and to the Blowfish cryptography algorithm used in OpenSSH. OpenBSD also has a number of slogans including "Secure by default", which was used in the first OpenBSD song, "E-railed", and "Free, Functional & Secure", and OpenBSD has released at least one original song with every release since 3.0.

The DragonFly BSD logo, designed by Joe Angrisano, is a dragonfly named Fred. A number of unofficial logos by various authors also show the dragonfly or stylized versions of it. DragonFly BSD considers itself to be "the logical continuation of the FreeBSD 4.x series." FireflyBSD has a similar logo, a firefly, showing its close relationship to DragonFly BSD. In fact, the FireflyBSD website states that proceeds from sales will go to the development of DragonFly BSD, suggesting that the two may in fact be very closely related.

PicoBSD's slogan is "For the little BSD in all of us," and its logo includes a version of FreeBSD's Beastie as a child, showing its close connection to FreeBSD, and the minimal amount of code needed to run as a Live CD.

A number of BSD OSes use stylized version of their respective names for logos. This includes TrueOS, GhostBSD, DesktopBSD, ClosedBSD, and MicroBSD. TrueOS's slogan is "Personal computing, served up BSD style!", GhostBSD's "A simple, secure BSD served on a Desktop." DesktopBSD's "A Step Towards BSD on the Desktop." MicroBSD's slogan is "The small secure unix like OS."

MirOS's site collects a variety of BSD mascots and Tux, the Linux mascot, together, illustrating the project's aim of supporting both BSD and Linux kernels. MirOS's slogan is "a wonderful operating system for a world of peace."

== General information ==
Overview of BSD versions
Name	Primary developers	First public release	Based on	Latest stable version		Cost (USD)	Preferred license	Purpose	Short description
Name	Primary developers	First public release	Based on	Version	Release date	Cost (USD)	Preferred license	Purpose	Short description
FreeBSD	The FreeBSD Project	1993-12-01	386BSD, 4.4BSD-Lite	15	2025-12-02	Free	Simplified BSD	Server, Workstation, Network Appliance, Embedded	Aims to be usable for any purpose.
OpenBSD	The OpenBSD Project	1996-09-01	NetBSD 1.0	8.0	2026-10-20	Free	ISC	Server, Workstation, Network Appliance, Embedded	Aims for maximum correctness in code, bringing simplicity and security.
NetBSD	The NetBSD Project	1993-04-19	386BSD, 4.4BSD-Lite	11.0	2026-07-30	Free	Simplified BSD	Server, Workstation, Network Appliance, Embedded	Aims for maximum portability.
DragonFly BSD	Matt Dillon	2004-07-12	FreeBSD 4.8	6.4.2	2025-05-09	Free	Modified BSD	Server, Workstation, Network Appliance, Embedded	Aims for maximum scalability.
386BSD (Note: 386BSD, BSD/OS, SunOS, and Ultrix are historic operating systems that are no longer developed. BSDeviant and ekkoBSD do not exist anymore either, although BSDeviant is still available for download (see external links). MicroBSD ended, then started again in 2003, but it does not seem that any progress has been made since then, though the website still exists.)	William and Lynne Jolitz	1992-03-01	4.3BSD Net/2	2.0	2016-08-05	Free	BSD	Open source general purpose	Historical
BSD/OS (BSD/386)	BSDi, Wind River Systems	1993-03-01	4.3BSD Net/2, 4.4BSD	5.1	2003-10-01	?	Proprietary	General purpose	Historical
SunOS (Note: This article only refers to SunOS through version 4.x. SunOS from release 5.x forward is based on SVR4, and is most commonly referred to as Solaris.)	Sun Microsystems	1982	4.xBSD, UNIX System V	4.1.4	1994-11-01	Included in hardware and support charges	Proprietary	Server, Workstation	Historical (Solaris is a different code base)
Ultrix	Digital Equipment Corporation	1984	4.2BSD, SVR2	4.5	1995	?	Proprietary	General Purpose	Historical (ran on DEC VAX & MIPS systems or emulators).
RISCiX	Acorn Computers	1988	4.3 BSD, Unix System V	1.31c	1993-09-07	Cost £1000 GBP (Approx $1400)	Proprietary	Workstation	Historical (ran on Archimedes and R series Workstations)
Tru64 UNIX (DEC OSF/1, Digital UNIX)	DEC, Compaq, HP	1993	4.3BSD, 4.4BSD, Mach 2.5, UNIX System V	5.1B-6	2010-10-01	Cost $99 (non-commercial)	Proprietary	General Purpose	Only runs on HP Alpha systems or emulators.
Darwin	Apple Inc.	2001-03-01	NeXTSTEP, FreeBSD, classic Mac OS	25.0.0	2025-09-15	Free	APSL, GPL and others	Workstation, Home Desktop, Server	The kernel and certain userland components of macOS and iOS
TrueOS	iXsystems, Inc.	2006-04-29	FreeBSD	18.12	2018-12-15	Free	BSD	Server	Easy to use while maintaining full use of FreeBSD base
GhostBSD	Eric Turgeon	2009-11-01	FreeBSD	25.02-R14.3p2	2025-08-25	Free	BSD	Desktop, Workstation	Easy to use, full FreeBSD w/ GNOME, Mate, Xfce, LXDE or Openbox.
FuryBSD	Joe Maloney	2019-10-24	FreeBSD	12.1-2020090701 (2020Q3)	2020-09-14	Free	BSD	Desktop, Workstation	Easy to use, full FreeBSD w/ Xfce or KDE.
DesktopBSD	Peter Hofer, Daniel Seuffert	2005-07-25	FreeBSD	1.7	2009-09-07	Free	BSD	Desktop	Easy to use
ClosedBSD	Joshua Bergeron and various contributors	?	FreeBSD	1.0B (floppy), 1.0-RC1 (CD)	?	Free	Proprietary	?	firewall/NAT, boot floppy, Live CD
FreeSBIE	?	?	FreeBSD	2.0.3	2007-02-01	Free	?	?	Live CD of FreeBSD. DistroWatch lists as discontinued.
PicoBSD	Michael Bialecki	?	FreeBSD	0.42	?	Free	BSD	boot floppy	?
Anonym.OS	?	2005-01-01	OpenBSD 3.8	none (beta only)	?	Free	?	Anonymous browsing	Live CD
MirOS BSD	The MirOS Project	?	OpenBSD 3.1	#10	2008-03-16	Free	?	?	European
ekkoBSD	Rick Collette	?	OpenBSD 3.3	?	?	?	?	Server	easy to administer
MicroBSD	Bulgarians	?	OpenBSD 3.0/3.4	0.6	2003-10-27	Free	?	General purpose	Small, secure
OliveBSD	Gabriel Paderni	?	OpenBSD 3.8	?	?	Free	?	Live CD	DistroWatch lists as discontinued.
Gentoo/FreeBSD	Gentoo Linux developers	?	FreeBSD	?	?	Free	GPL, BSD	Server, Workstation, Network Appliance	uses Gentoo framework
Gentoo/OpenBSD	Gentoo Linux developers	?	OpenBSD	?	?	Free	GPL, BSD	Server, Workstation, Network Appliance, Embedded	uses Gentoo framework
Gentoo/NetBSD	Gentoo Linux developers	?	NetBSD	?	?	Free	GPL, BSD	Server, Workstation, Network Appliance, Embedded	uses Gentoo framework
Gentoo/DragonflyBSD	Robert Sebastian Gerus (project not yet officially supported by Gentoo)	?	DragonFly BSD	?	?	Free	?	Server, Workstation, Network Appliance	uses Gentoo framework
Debian GNU/kFreeBSD	The Debian GNU/kFreeBSD team	2011-02-06	GNU, FreeBSD	7.5	2014-04-26	Free	DFSG	General purpose	GNU userspace on FreeBSD kernel
Debian GNU/NetBSD	The Debian GNU/kNetBSD team	Abandoned	GNU, NetBSD	Abandoned	Abandoned	Free	DFSG	General purpose	GNU userspace on NetBSD kernel
MidnightBSD	Lucas Holt	2007-08-04	FreeBSD 6.1 beta	3.2	2024-07-22	Proprietary	Modified FreeBSD licence, Proprietary	Desktop	GNUstep based Desktop Environment
NomadBSD	The NomadBSD Team	2018-03-25	FreeBSD	141R-20240711	2024-07-15	Free	BSD	Live USB	Openbox based Desktop Environment
pfSense	various contributors	2006-10-04	FreeBSD	2.8.1	2025-09-04	Free	BSD	Security appliance	firewall/NAT, Live CD
OPNsense	various contributors	2015-01-02	pfSense	25.7.9	2025-12-04	Free	BSD	Security appliance	firewall/NAT, Live CD
Paxym FreeBSD for Octeon	Paxym Inc.	2007-12-11	FreeBSD 7.0	4.7	2008-08-13	?	Proprietary	Network, Storage, Security Applications: Routers/UTM/Firewall/NAS	For Cavium Networks Octeon MIPS architecture multicore processors
KarmaBSD		?	FreeBSD 8 OpenBSD	?	?	Free	Free software	FreeBSD, OpenBSD Firewall, MP3 player, backup, others	
Jibbed			OpenBSD, NetBSD	6.0		Free	BSD		Live CD of NetBSD
Bitrig	The Bitrig Developers	2014-11-25	OpenBSD	1.0	2014-11-25	Free	ISC	General Purpose	Focus on modern platforms and tools
StarBSD	digital IXI Corp	2009-12-01	FreeBSD	2020.3	2020-03-25	Free	Simplified BSD	Server, Workstation, Network Appliance, Embedded	Aims for maximum scalability.
	Developer	First public release	Based on	Version	Release date	Cost (USD)	Preferred license	Purpose	Short description

== See also ==
- List of BSD operating systems
- Lumina (desktop environment)
- BSD license
- Comparison of open source operating systems
- Comparison of operating systems

== Notes and references ==
=== Other sources ===
- Milo; et al. (1998-06-22). "FreeBSD". Operating System Technical Comparison. OSdata. Archived from the original on 2007-01-14.
- Milo; et al. (1998-06-22). "OpenBSD". Operating System Technical Comparison.
- Milo; et al. (1998-06-22). "NetBSD". Operating System Technical Comparison. OSdata.
- Milo; et al. (1998-06-22). "SunOS". Operating System Technical Comparison. OSdata.
- "SunOS & Solaris version history". Berkeley. Archived from the original on 2006-02-09.
- "Ultrix FAQ". 1996-11-04. Archived from the original on 2006-05-19.
- Milo ' (1998-06-22). "Ultrix". Operating System Technical Comparison. OSdata.
- Milo; et al. (1998-06-22). "Mac OS X". Operating System Technical Comparison. OSdata.
- Milo; et al. (1998-06-22). "Mac OS X Server". Operating System Technical Comparison. OSdata. Archived from the original on 2007-01-14.
- "BSDeviant download page". Bsdeviant.org. Archived from the original on 2008-09-05. A semi-official download page.
- "ekkoBSD 1.0 BETA1B Released". Slashdot. 2003-11-25.
- Milo; et al. (1998-05-31). "Operating System Technical Comparison". OSdata.
- Brown, Martin (2004-08-10). "Differentiating Among BSD Distros". Jupitermedia Corporation. p. 4.
- Schneider, Wolfram; Gilliam, Josh; Schultz, Steven M. (1997–2004). "The UNIX system family tree: Research and BSD" (ASCII). The NetBSD Foundation.
