= Tnftp =

Open-source FTP client

tnftp
- Developer: Luke Mewburn
- Stable release: 20260211 / 11 February 2026
- Operating system: Cross-platform
- Type: FTP client
- License: BSD-4-Clause
- Repository: ftp.netbsd.org/pub/NetBSD/misc/tnftp/

tnftp (formerly lukemftp) is an enhanced FTP client for Unix-like operating systems. It is based on the original BSD FTP client, and is the default FTP client included with NetBSD, FreeBSD, OpenBSD, DragonFly BSD, Darwin, and MidnightBSD. It is maintained by Luke Mewburn.

It is notable in its support of server-side tab completion, a feature that the FTP client in GNU inetutils lacks.
