= Status key =

Computer command

In computing, a status key is a keyboard key that causes an operating system and/or a program to output status information on a terminal when it is pressed. In the event that a program on a terminal produces no indications that it is running, typing the status key will reveal the program's state and activity. Older implementations produced only a quick one-line status report for the current job when the status key was pressed. Newer implementations support sending a signal to the current process to allow the application to report on status as well.

== Operating system-level implementations ==
Several different operating systems have a status key feature implemented in the kernel or other low-level component.

=== TENEX ===
TENEX has the feature since at least 1971: "Another terminal Interrupt character, control-T is serviced by the EXEC. It interrupts a user's EXEC process to type out total CPU and console time used, and status of the fork being run under the EXEC."

=== DEC RSTS/E ===
RSTS/E is documented as having CTRL/T (control-T) as a status key at least as far back as 1977 and it continued to have one into at least the 1980s. Typing the status key results in output that is represented by the following example:

18   GARP::KB32   SYSTAT+BAS4F     ^C(0R)   11(16)K+ 16K  3.3(+5)

Field	Value
Job number	18
Node name	GARP
Keyboard number	KB32
Program or Operation	SYSTAT
Run-time system name	BAS4
Job state	^C(0R)
Program size in words	11
Maximum size in words	(16)K
Run-time system size in words	+16K
Amount of CPU time used	3.3
CPU time since the last CTRL/T	(+.5)

=== DEC TOPS-10 ===
On TOPS-10 when the CTRL/T (control-T) key is pressed, the monitor prints status information pertaining to the job on the terminal. Typing CTRL/T displays a job's progress without interrupting its execution. No representation of a control-T character is displayed on the terminal, just the status information.

DAY: :05:43 RUN:0.48 RD:75 WR:8 SOS 12+19p ^C Ctx:1 PC:400275

Incremental values in the table below indicate that the value is the accumulation since login or last CTRL/T whichever was shortest.

Field	Value
Incremental day time	DAY: :05:43
Incremental run time	RUN:0.48
Incremental disk reads	RD:75
Incremental disk writes	WR:8
Program name	SOS
Amount of memory program is using	12+19p
Context number	Ctx:1
Job state code	^C
Program Counter	PC:400275
Job state, INPUT WAIT or OUTPUT WAIT	(only when CTRL/T is used at USER level)

=== DEC TOPS-20 ===
TOPS-20 reports a shorter list of information than its predecessors:

09:36:35 TEST Running at 404157 Used 0:00:35.8 in 0:30:39, Load 4.04

Field	Value
Time	09:36:35
Name	TEST
Status	Running at 404157
Used CPU-time	Used 0:00:35.8
Logged-in-time	in 0:30:39
Load average	Load 4.04

=== MIT ITS ===
ITS copied the idea from TOPS-20, but used the key sequence Control+_ J.

19:29:10 3 RMS    HACTRN EMACS1 130566

Field	Value
Time	19:29:10
Job index	3
User name	RMS
Job name	HACTRN
System name	EMACS1
User program counter	130566

=== VSI OpenVMS ===
OpenVMS has a status key which can be customized and works with remote processes. The default output includes these items:

NODE22::SMITH  16:21:04 (DCL) CPU=00:03:29.39 PF=14802 IO=18652 MEM=68

Field	Value
Node and process name	NODE22::SMITH
Time of day	16:21:04
Active image name	(DCL)
Processor time used	CPU=00:03:29.39
Accumulated page faults	PF=14802
I/O operations	IO=18652
Frames in use	MEM=68

=== BSD UNIX ===
4.3BSD-Reno, BSD systems derived from that version, and OSF/1 have a status key which defaults to Ctrl-T and can be assigned to any key. It sends SIGINFO to the current process which is ignored by default but can be configured to call a function which can display status information from the program.

load: 0.10  cmd: sleep 1594 [nanslp] 1.33r 0.00u 0.00s 0% 1864k

Field	Value
Five minute load average	load: 0.10
Command name	cmd: sleep
Process ID	1594
Wait channel name or lock name	[nanslp]
Elapsed real time	1.33r
Elapsed user CPU time	0.00u
Elapsed system CPU time	0.00s
Percentage of CPU	0%
Program memory resident set size	1864k

==== macOS ====
Because macOS has a kernel, XNU, with code from Mach and FreeBSD, the terminal driver supports the BSD status key.

load: 3.04 cmd: sleep 719 waiting 0.00u 0.00s

Field	Value
Five minute load average	load: 3.04
Command name	cmd: sleep
Process ID	719
Wait channel name or lock name	waiting
Elapsed user CPU time	0.00u
Elapsed system CPU time	0.00s

== Application-level implementations ==
It addition to implementing a status key in the kernel or related OS component, some applications have features that allow you to press a key to view the application's status.

=== SDS-940 running BBN Lisp in 1969 ===
BBN Lisp which runs on an SDS 940 had a status key which was implemented in the Lisp which ran on an OS, rather than in the OS kernel itself.

Control-T

Print Time. Causes an immediate
printout of the total execution time
(in clock ticks) for the job, (even
during garbage collections), i.e.
clock[2], (p. 14.22). A series of
such printouts should show increasing
numbers if the program is using any
CPU time. Of course, the program is
not using CPU time if it is waiting
for input. This information may
serve to help the user determine if
his LISP and/or the time sharing sys-
tem has crashed.
