= Fredrik Correa =

Swedish powerlifter and strength training entrepreneur

Personal information
- Nationality: Swedish
- Born: 8 February 1977 (age 49)
- Education: Karolinska Institute; Swedish School of Sport and Health Sciences
- Employer: Exxentric
- Website: exxentric.com/fredrik-correa/

Sport
- Country: Sweden
- Sport: Powerlifting
- Weight class: 93 kg (205 lb)
- Club: Täby AK

Achievements and titles
- World finals: 2021 World Masters Classic Powerlifting Championships: 5th
- Regional finals: 2022 European Masters Classic Powerlifting Championships: 4th, 1st in DL; 2020 European Masters Classic Powerlifting Championships: 3rd
- National finals: 2025 Swedish Classic Open Powerlifting Nationals: 6th; 2022–2026 Swedish Master Classic Powerlifting Nationals: 1st; 2019 Swedish Master Classic Powerlifting Nationals: 2nd

Fredrik Correa (born 8 February 1977) is a Swedish strength training entrepreneur and competitive powerlifter.

He is the CEO and co-founder of the flywheel training company Exxentric since 2011, where he has contributed to developing the kBox and selling it to 60 countries and winning awards for Swedish growth companies. Since 2018 he has been competing in masters classic powerlifting, finalling 1st–5th in Swedish, European and World championships, and he is a frequent podcast guest, lecturer and interviewee in Europe and the Americas within the field of strength training.

Fredrik Correa has a background as physician from Karolinska Institute in Stockholm specialized in dermatology. Before that, he was a junior ice hockey coach, and earned a B.Sc. in sports science at the Swedish School of Sport and Health Sciences.
