= Indiana Gregg =

American singer-songwriter

Indiana "Indy" Gregg
- Indiana Gregg at Powderham Castle Exeter

Background information
- Origin: Terre Haute, Indiana
- Genres: Country; Soul
- Occupations: Song-writer, Entrepreneur
- Instruments: Vocals, guitar, piano
- Years active: 1999 —present
- Website: indianagregg.com

Indiana Gregg born in Terre Haute, Indiana is a singer-songwriter and tech entrepreneur living in Lenzie near Glasgow, Scotland. Her music contains elements of pop, soul and folk. Releases include featured artist on Kool & the Gang's "The Hits Reloaded" where she performed their hit titled "Tonight" and a 2007 debut release of her album "Woman At Work" with singles "Sweet Things", "Love Is Blind" and "One of Us" released from the album in April, June and October 2007 respectively.

== Early years ==
Indiana suffered from a strong speech impediment in her youth. She underwent years of speech therapy where her therapist would ask her to write poems at home for her to practice singing to help overcome this condition. Indiana claims that her therapist encouraged her to become involved in music and is responsible for her development as a songwriter and an artist. The Sunday Herald quotes Indiana saying, "I was five when I wrote my first song, about my cat, Herbert, who was hit by a train".

Indiana studied music and physiotherapy at University. In 1991, she won an all-American title and National Dance Association dance championship in Dallas, Texas.

== Career as an executive ==
=== Wedo ===
In 2021, Indiana founded Wedo, a social networking and fintech plus banking application. The company appointed David Jaques, founding CFO of PayPal as its chairman in 2021. The founder has been featured in Forbes where Indiana stated “By 2027 freelancers will make up more than 52% of the global job market, with many choosing to do it for the independence and flexibility that it brings. Hiring freelancers and gig workers can help a company scale quickly, and hiring those from overseas also boosts diversity, which can lead to higher levels of creativity and innovation.” According to the TechTimes, the startup provides a seamless social video application that helps people transact and earn online. The platform is mobile and web-based to keep the barriers of entry low. Anyone with knowledge to share and a smartphone can start their online business and collect a payment for the service they provide. The former singer/songwriter and five time founder raised $1.5M in investment in a pre-seed round from a non-disclosed VC fund. The platform acts like a social network, but is aimed to help the independent economy and freelancers work. The app aims to offer:

A commission-free marketplace A library of premium apps including 4K video conferencing, chat, banking, invoicing, project, event management Virtual office in a box where users can access tax advice, pay bills, pensions, office space, training and hiring A social network allowing users to be discovered, search for skills and partnerships, collaborate and recommend. In December 2022, Wedo announced raising its second round, with a number of commitments already secured.

Indiana was listed amongst the top ten influential business leaders to follow. The company is focused on creating a fair playing field for all through the app.

=== Kerchoonz ===
Indiana was also founder and director of Kerchoonz.com, a social networking platform and artist aggregation and marketplace that was launched in 2008 and bought-out in 2010. The model for which changed the face of the music industry today.

Other roles: Global managing director and founder of Cosmetic Laboratory of Europe, and founder of Wedo, a neobanking SaaS platform experience to create synergies between people, businesses, and their network. She is a keynote speaker MIDEM on digital marketing and effective content delivery. Tippit Festival on the topic of Socially Conscious Creativity and Entrepreneurship.

Indiana has served executive and non-exec roles and has founded several companies including Kerchoonz, Cosmetic Laboratory of Europe, Gr8pop, Digital-Unicorns, Wedo and Eventous. The roots and beginnings of Indiana's professional career began in 1994 when she moved to southern France and lived there for 12 years (amongst other countries such as Germany, Finland and England).

== Career as musician ==
She appeared on the track Tonight from Kool and the Gang's album, The Hits Reloaded.

Her debut album, Woman at Work, was released to the UK in April 2007. The diversity of her music has been explained as an artistic well or "stew": "It's like a stew that has been cooking for a long while: well blended and tasty. Ms. Gregg has achieved a rare feat in the world of music outside of jazz: she has created something organic. And it didn't happen overnight."

In 2005 two of her songs, "Sweet Things" and "For Life", made it to the top finalists in the Pop category (56 finalists out of the 4000 songs entered) of The UK Songwriting Contest. These two songs were later also released on her 2007 album titled Woman at Work. In 2005, Indiana also did a supporting tour with Wet Wet Wet.

In 2005, the demo album "Something like me" had a limited release on the independent label Onestone Music. Later that year, Onestone Music did a deal with Scottish label Gr8pop Ltd. In 2006, Gr8pop ltd. did a deal with Ingenious VCT intended to release Gregg's debut album in 2007.

== Tours and "Home Concerts" ==
Indiana received media attention in early summer of 2007 surrounding her "home concert" competitions where fans entered from all over the world to win a chance at having her play in their home for their friends. The competitions were covered in articles appearing in the Evening Times, Daily Record, Daily Mirror and various regional newspapers in the UK. Videos of her home gigs were posted to YouTube, Myspace, MSN and various other websites with a message about the free competition details. Winners for the series were announced on Myspace and subsequently, UKgigs TV began filming the new series in May 2007. Subsequently, videos of the home gigs were streamed on the front pages of Bebo and over the UK gigs and theatre networks.

The Home concerts first appeared in the press when the Express wrote about a surprise concert she performed for a fan's fiancée home in 2005 after he saw her live in Exeter supporting Wet Wet Wet. Indiana Gregg announced home concerts in the fall of 2005 which took place primarily in October. In December 2005, she embarked on Starbucks coffee house tour in every major UK city playing intimate acoustic sets in the coffee houses throughout 2006 whilst recording her debut album in the same year. In February and March 2007, she played a UK support tour with Lemar. Indiana, 35 married Ian Morrow, 50 during a 22-date arena and theatre tour with Lemar on March 22, 2007, in Gretna Green's Famous Blacksmith's following her concert at the SECC in Glasgow. Immediately following the Lemar tour, in April 2007 she began a third "House Gigs" tour which led to UKgigs.tv taking interest in filming the home concerts. The first filmed home concert took place in her own Glasgow home on May 21. On May 23, she played a concert in Finchley North London for the Ovarian Cancer Support group. On May 25, she played a home concert for young fashion designer Hannah Marshall in Colchester. Subsequent gigs were scheduled and filmed across the UK in Birmingham, Newcastle, Manchester, Glasgow, and Edinburgh the week beginning June 10. Scotland's Daily Record featured the Indiana Gregg Home gigs on June 12 along with a contest for Father's Day where contestants could win a home concert for their father by texting or phoning The Daily Record in Scotland. On Wednesday, June 13, The Daily Mirror ran a feature on the front page of the "Your Life" section about Indiana Gregg's house gigs featuring a home concert she did in Clare O'Hagan's front room in support of Ovarian Cancer.

The general awareness at this early stage of her career led to performances in festivals in the UK in summer 2007.

== Discography ==
- Sweet Things (March 26, 2007, Gr8pop) (Single)
- Woman at Work (April 2, 2007, Gr8pop) (Album)
- One of Us (October 8, 2007, Gr8pop) (Single)
- Sweet Things (November 6, 2007, Gr8pop/Playground Scandinavia)
- Woman at Work (November 12, 2007, Gr8pop/Playground Scandinavia)
- Tonight Kool & The Gang(August 2004)
