= Anonym.OS =

Linux distribution

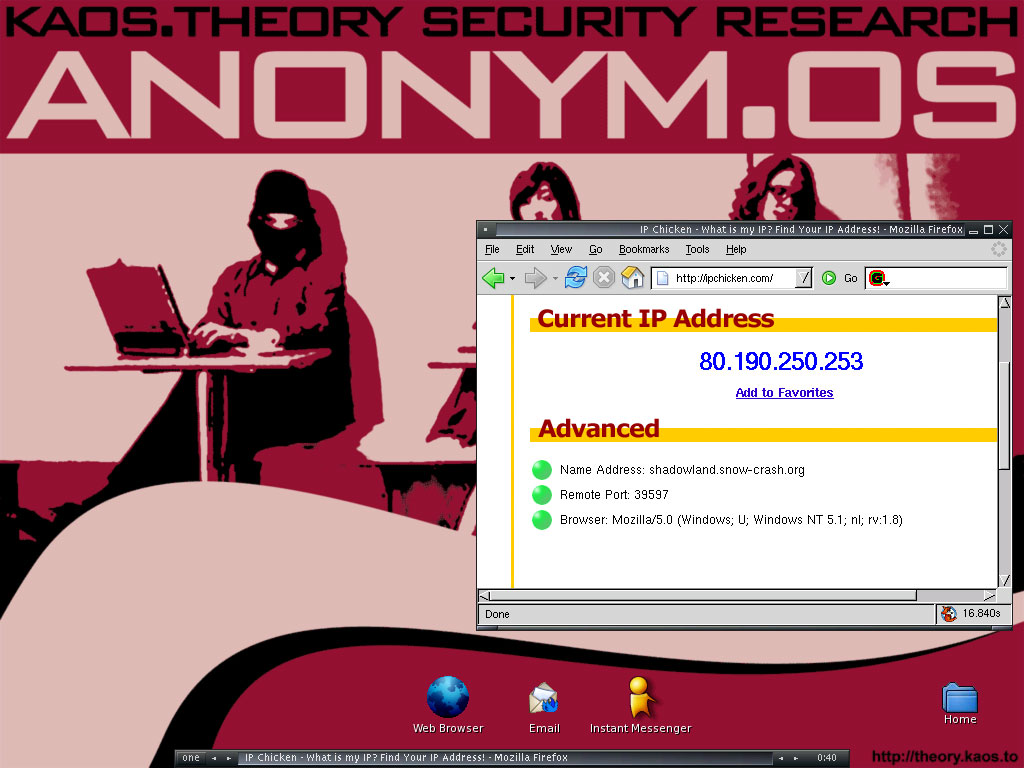
- A screenshot of Anonym.OS Beta 4
- Developer: kaos.theory
- OS family: OpenBSD
- Working state: Unmaintained
- Source model: Open source
- Latest release: Beta 4 / 2006
- Kernel type: Monolithic
- Official website: www.sourceforge.net

Anonym.OS was a live CD operating system based on OpenBSD 3.8 with strong encryption and anonymization tools. The goal of the project was to provide secure, anonymous web browsing access to everyday users. The operating system was OpenBSD 3.8, although many packages have been added to facilitate its goal. It used Fluxbox as its window manager.

The project was discontinued after the release of Beta 4 (2006).

== Distributed ==
Designed, created and distributed by kaos.theory/security.research.

== Legacy ==
Although this specific project is no longer updated, its successors are Incognito OS (discontinued in 2008) and FreeSBIE.

== See also ==
- Comparison of BSD operating systems
- Security-focused operating system
