= Lumina (desktop environment) =

Desktop environment for X Window System

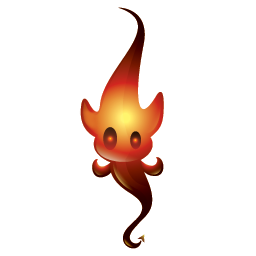
- Lumina Wisp

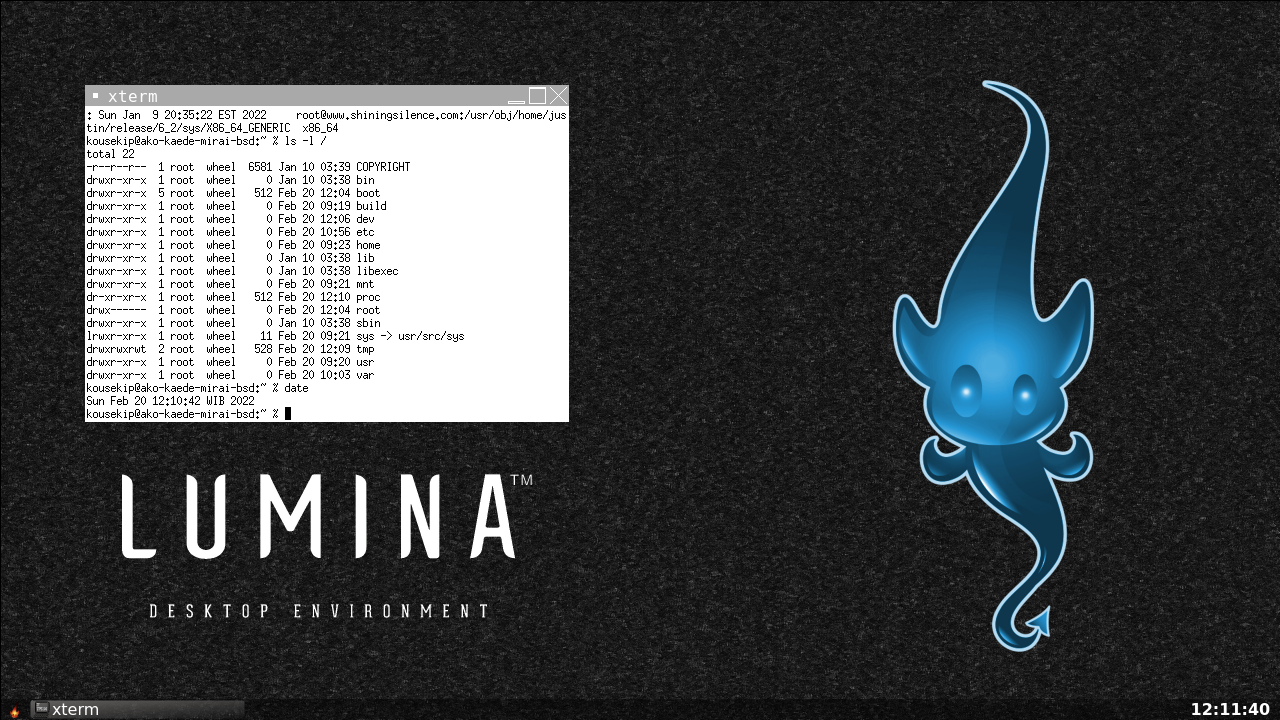
- Lumina 1.6.2 on DragonFly BSD
- Original author: Ken Moore
- Developer: iXsystems
- Release: 8 August 2016; 10 years ago
- Stable release: 1.6.2 / 26 December 2021; 4 years ago
- Written in: C++
- Operating system: Unix and Unix-like
- Type: Desktop environment
- License: BSD-3-Clause
- Website: lumina-desktop.org
- Repository: github.com/lumina-desktop/lumina

Lumina, or Lumina Desktop Environment, is a plugin-based desktop environment for Unix and Unix-like operating systems. It was designed specifically as a system interface for the now-discontinued TrueOS as well as systems derived from Berkeley Software Distribution (BSD) in general, but it has been ported to various Linux distributions.

== History ==
Created in 2012 by Ken Moore, Lumina was initially a set of extensions to Fluxbox, a stacking window manager for the X Window System. By late 2013, Moore had developed a graphical overlay for Fluxbox based on Qt4, and had created a utility for "launching applications and opening files". The codebase was integrated into the PC-BSD source repository by early 2014, and a port was added to the FreeBSD Ports collection in April 2014. The source code has since been moved to a separate GitHub repository "under the PC-BSD umbrella" and converted to use Qt5. Development also focused on replacing the Fluxbox core with a Qt-based window manager integrated with the Lumina desktop.

The project avoids use of Linux-based tools or frameworks, such as D-Bus, Polkit, and systemd.

== Features ==
The desktop and application menus are dynamically configured upon first being launched, as the desktop environment finds installed applications automatically to add to the menu and as a desktop icon. The default panel includes a Start menu, task manager, and system tray, and its location can be customized. Menus may be accessed via the Start menu or by right-clicking the mouse on the desktop background.

Some features are specific to TrueOS, including hardware control of screen brightness (monitor backlight), preventing shutdown of an updating system, and integration with various TrueOS utilities.

Utilities include: Insight, a file manager; File information, which reports a file's format and other details; and Lumina Open, a graphical utility to launch applications based on the selected file or folder.

Version 1.4 included several new utilities. The PDF reader lumina-pdf is based on the poppler library. The Lumina Theme Engine replaced an earlier theme system; it enables a user to configure the desktop appearance and functionality, and ensures all Qt5 applications "present a unified appearance".

== Ports ==
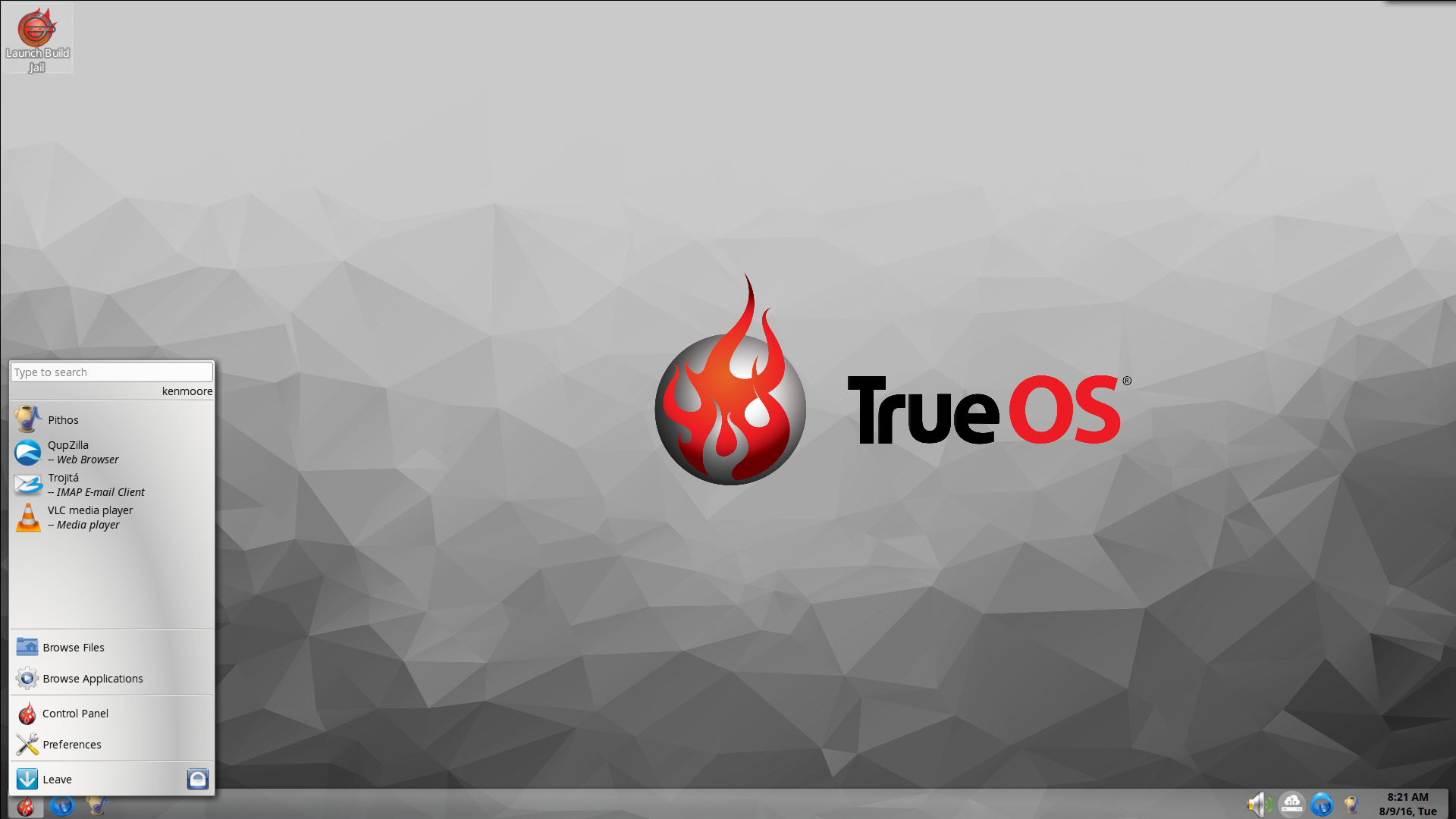
Lumina 1.0.0 on TrueOS

Lumina has been ported to various BSD operating systems and Linux distributions. These include:

- Berkeley Software Distribution
  - DragonFly BSD
  - FreeBSD
  - NetBSD
  - OpenBSD
  - TrueOS (Discontinued in 2020)
- Linux distributions
  - antiX Linux
  - Arch Linux
  - Debian
  - Fedora 24+
  - Gentoo Linux
  - Hyperbola GNU/Linux-libre
  - Manjaro Linux
  - NixOS
  - PCLinuxOS
  - Void Linux

== See also ==
- BSD licenses
- Comparison of BSD operating systems
- List of BSD operating systems
- Ports collection
