= NomadBSD =

Open source Unix-like operating system

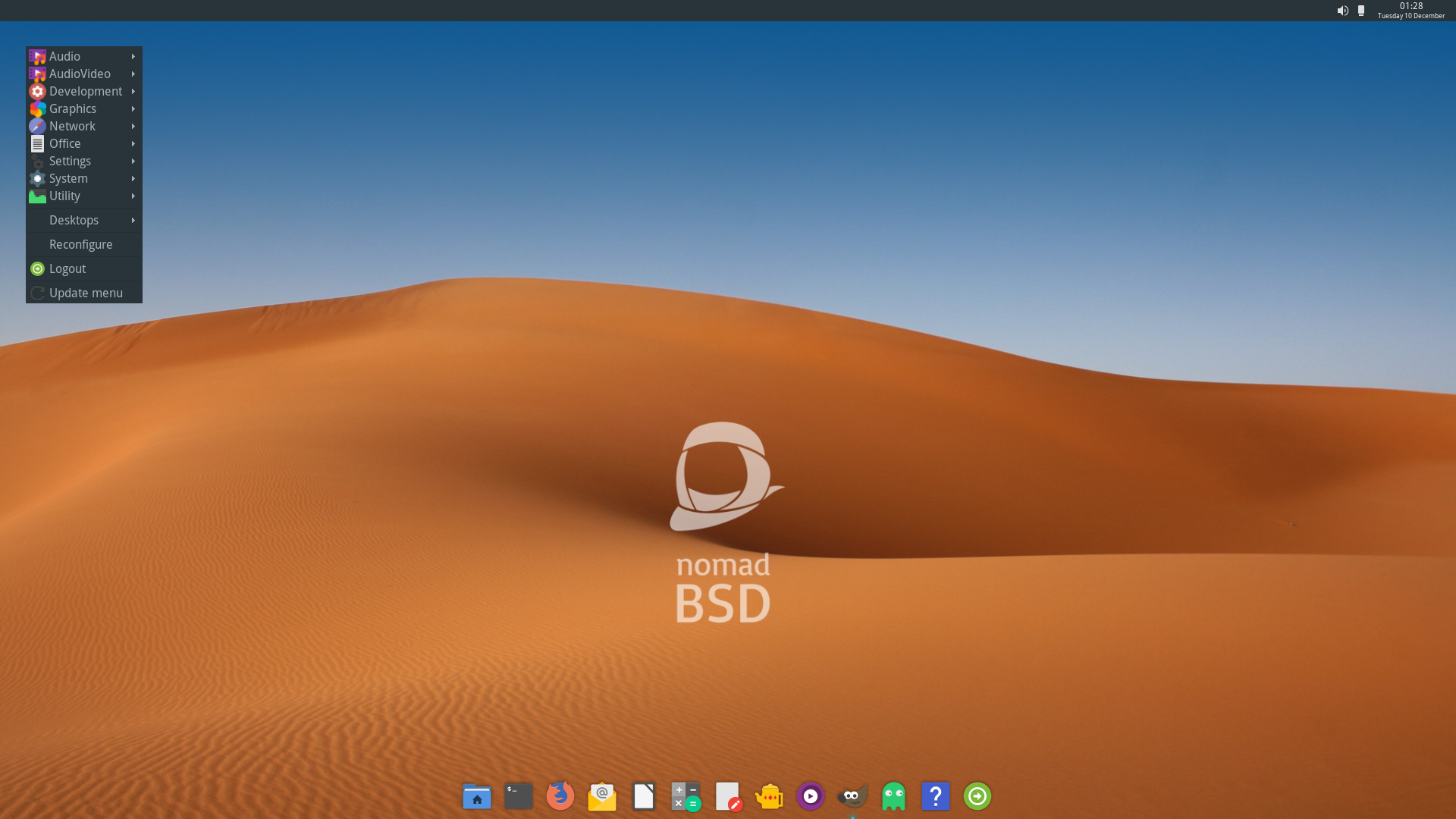

NomadBSD is a free and open source Unix-like operating system based on FreeBSD meant to be installed onto a USB storage device, unlike how operating systems are generally installed onto a computer's hard drive. NomadBSD can be used on a different computer than the one it was last used on, by simply disconnecting the USB storage device from the previous computer and connecting it to another different one for it to boot from. NomadBSD retains the user's files and installed packages on the USB storage device it is installed on, and this is called persistence. NomadBSD is mainly a desktop computer focused operating system, and its key principles are security, stability, and ease of use. NomadBSD uses X.org as its display server and Openbox as its window manager. NomadBSD targets computer users who travel, who may need to use a different computer but want to carry their own customized desktop installation with them, and without leaving a record on the used computer as all the changes the operating system would make are only ever directed to the storage device which it runs on, causing no writes to the computer being used. NomadBSD is also useful for system recovery and some educational purposes. NomadBSD is described as requiring modest computing hardware to run successfully. The source code of the project is hosted on GitHub. NomadBSD features optional support for GELI encryption. Some of its preinstalled applications include Firefox, Thunderbird, GIMP, KeePassXC, Leafpad, Midnight Commander, Plank, Geany, Thunar, Xarchiver, Sakura terminal.

== Reviews ==
On It's FOSS one writer John Paul Wohlscheid remarked "Overall, my experience with NomadBSD was pleasant. Once I figured out a few things, I was good to go. I hope that NomadBSD is the first of a new generation of BSDs that focus on mobility and ease of use. BSD has conquered the server world, it's about time they figured out how to be more user-friendly."

== See also ==
- GhostBSD
- Comparison of BSD operating systems
- List of BSD operating systems
- Comparison of open-source operating systems
