= Coyote Point Systems =

- Type: Private company
- Industry: Technology
- Founded: 1998
- Fate: Acquired by Fortinet in 2013
- Headquarters: Millerton, New York, USA and San Jose, California, USA
- Products: Equalizer application traffic management appliance
- Website: coyotepoint.com

Coyote Point Systems was a manufacturer of computer networking equipment for application traffic management, also known as server load balancing. In March 2013, the company was acquired by Fortinet.

The company introduced hardware-based server load balancers nearly simultaneously with other large companies such as F5 in the late 1990s. The company had its headquarters in San Jose, California, and maintained engineering facilities in Millerton, New York, USA.

== History ==
Early Coyote Point customers included Wired for the HotWired Web magazine, and the online movie database IMDb. Coyote Point introduced several generations of new hardware and software with increasing performance and functionality, winning industry and press awards including the 2006 Network Computing Well-Connected Award and the Info Security Global Product Excellence Award. The company's VLB technology, which permits load balancing of VMware infrastructure, was nominated for Best of Interop 2008 and SYS-CON's Virtualization Journal Readers' Choice Awards.

== Products and technology ==
Coyote Point developed traffic management appliances to improve application performance. In 2009, the company released three upgraded products as part of its Equalizer GX family of load balancing and application acceleration appliances. By monitoring server and application availability and responsiveness, the Equalizer line of load-balancing appliances direct individual client requests to the server best able to handle them. Coyote Point's products are generally deployed at data centers, serving as front-end aggregators of an array of web or application servers. Layer 7 rules (content switching) direct requests to servers hosting specific applications or content. Application acceleration technologies, such as SSL acceleration and HTTP compression are available on Coyote's higher-end products.

Custom hardware, such as Layer 2 switches and SSL offload processors, and custom operating systems based on FreeBSD are used in Coyote Point's appliances with performance of over 50,000 HTTP transactions per second in network benchmarks.
