= PicoBSD =

Operative system

PicoBSD is a discontinued single-floppy disk version of FreeBSD, one of the BSD operating system descendants. In its different variations, PicoBSD allows one to have secure dial-up Internet access, a small diskless router, or a dial-in server, all on one standard 1.44 MB floppy disc. It runs on a minimum 386SX CPU with 8 MB of RAM (no hard drive required).

PicoBSD is freely available under the BSD license. The main developer was Andrzej Bialecki, and the latest version is 0.42. Dinesh Nair had then backported the PicoBSD build scripts to FreeBSD 2.2.5, allowing the addition of a few more binaries in the dial-up flavor due to FreeBSD 2.2.5's smaller binary executable format.

With flexibility that FreeBSD gives, along with the full source code being available, one can build a small installation performing various tasks, including:

- Diskless workstation
- Portable dial-up access solution
- Custom demo-disk
- Embedded controller (flash or EEPROM)
- Firewall
- Communication server
- Replacement for commercial router
- Diskless home automation system
- And many others

PicoBSD is now included in the FreeBSD source files where it is used by embedded system developers to create their own system images. It can be used with recent versions of FreeBSD and it is located in /usr/src/release/picobsd/.

In FreeBSD 5, it has been superseded by the NanoBSD framework

== See also ==
- Comparison of BSD operating systems
