= Sweetest Thing (disambiguation) =

"Sweetest Thing" is a 1987 song by Irish rock band U2.

Sweetest Thing or The Sweetest Thing may also refer to:

== Music ==
- "The Sweetest Thing (I've Ever Known)", a 1975 song performed by Juice Newton and rereleased as a single in 1981
- "The Sweetest Thing" (Carlene Carter song), 1991
- "The Sweetest Thing" (Refugee Camp All Stars song), 1997
- "The Sweetest Thing", a song by Camera Obscura from the 2009 album My Maudlin Career
- "Sweetest Thing", a 2000 song by The Cranberries on Bury the Hatchet
- "Sweetest Thing", a 2026 song by Madonna on Confessions II

== Film and television ==
- The Sweetest Thing (film), a 2002 American romantic comedy film directed by Roger Kumble and written by Nancy Pimental
- "The Sweetest Thing", an episode from the Nick Jr. girls' animated TV show Shimmer and Shine
- "The Sweetest Thing" (Kavanagh QC), a 1995 television episode
- "The Sweetest Thing", an episode from the TV series Persona
- "The Sweetest Thing", an episode from the TV series Pennies from Heaven
- "The Sweetest Thing", an episode from the cooking TV series The Taste

== See also ==
- "Love Is the Sweetest Thing", a 1932 song written by Ray Noble and performed with his orchestra and Al Bowlly, covered many times
