= DesktopBSD =

Unix-derived operating system

- Developer: DesktopBSD Team
- OS family: UNIX
- Working state: Discontinued in 2015
- Source model: Open source
- Latest release: 1.7 / 7 September 2009; 17 years ago
- Package manager: FreeBSD Ports
- Supported platforms: amd64 and i386
- Kernel type: Monolithic
- Default user interface: K Desktop Environment 3
- License: FreeBSD license from FreeBSD base system; Artwork collection, logos: Creative Commons CC BY-NC 2.0 Austria; GPL from KDE
- Official website: www.desktopbsd.net

DesktopBSD was a Unix-derived, desktop-oriented operating system based on FreeBSD. Its goal was to combine the stability of FreeBSD with the ease of use of K Desktop Environment 3, the default graphical user interface.

== History and development ==
DesktopBSD was a customized installation of FreeBSD, rather than a fork. It was based on FreeBSD's latest stable branch, incorporating customized, preinstalled software such as KDE and DesktopBSD utilities and configuration files.

DesktopBSD was not intended to compete with TrueOS as a BSD-based desktop distribution, although they were similar in structure and goals. DesktopBSD was started about one year before the PC-BSD project, despite the first PC-BSD release before DesktopBSD's. Neither project intended to rival the other, and they had independent, distinctive features and intended outcomes; DesktopBSD used ports and packages for additional software installation, and PC-BSD introduced PBIs.

The final release was 1.7, which became available on 7 September 2009. According to the release announcement, "This is the last and final release of the DesktopBSD project", because the lead developer could no longer contribute the time required to maintain it. DesktopBSD was restarted under new leadership in May 2010, although development and announcements soon stopped. On 10 March 2013, a forum post said that the project was "in the process of being revived." A roadmap for DesktopBSD 2.0 was announced in September 2015 on the DesktopBSD site, with posted screenshots of a GNOME3-based desktop.

== See also ==
- Comparison of BSD operating systems
- FreeBSD
- MidnightBSD
- GhostBSD
