= Adjacent =

Adjacent or adjacency may refer to:

- Adjacent (graph theory) in a graph, two vertices that are both endpoints of the same edge, or two distinct edges that share an end vertex

== See also ==
- Adjacent angles, two angles that share a common ray
- Adjacent channel in broadcasting, a channel that is next to another channel
- Adjacency matrix, a matrix that represents a graph
- Adjacency pairs in pragmatics, paired utterances such as a question and answer
- Adjacent side (polygon), a side that shares an angle with another given side
- Adjacent side (right triangle), the side (or cathetus) of a right triangle that touches a given non-right angle
- Adjacent flag (geometry), a flag that shares all of its faces but one with another given flag
