= Ipsilon Networks =

Ipsilon Networks, Inc.
- Industry: Computer networking
- Founded: 1994; 32 years ago in Sunnyvale, California
- Defunct: 1997
- Fate: Acquired by Nokia
- Website: ipsilon.com at the Wayback Machine (archived 1997-04-14)

Ipsilon Networks, Inc., was a computer networking company which specialised in IP switching during the 1990s.

The first product called the IP Switch ATM 1600 was announced in March 1996 for US$46,000. Its switch used Asynchronous Transfer Mode (ATM) hardware combined with Internet Protocol routing. The company had a role in the development of the Multiprotocol Label Switching (MPLS) network protocol. The company published early proposals related to label switching, but did not manage to achieve the market share hoped for and was purchased for $120 million by Nokia in December 1997. The president at the time was Brian NeSmith, and it was located in Sunnyvale, California.
