= KBox (exercise equipment) =

Flywheel-based resistance training device

kBox
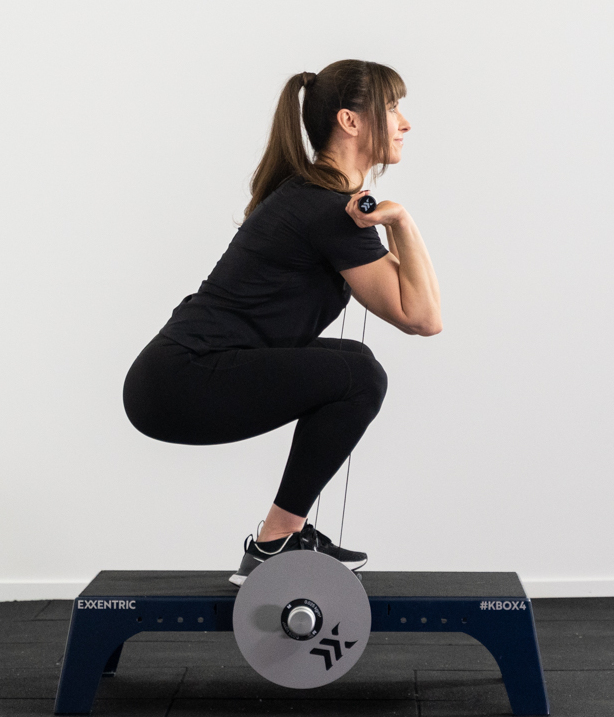
- A thruster performed on a kBox
- Type: Flywheel training exercise equipment
- Inventor: Fredrik Correa; Mårten Fredriksson
- Inception: 2011
- Manufacturer: Exxentric
- Models: kBox; kBox2; kBox2.5; kBox3; kBox4 Pro; kBox4 Lite; kBox Gen5
- Website: http://exxentric.com/kbox

kBox is a line of flywheel-based resistance training devices manufactured by the Swedish company Exxentric.

The device uses the inertia of a spinning flywheel to provide variable resistance that varies according to the user's force output during the concentric (lifting/pulling) and eccentric (lowering/return) phases of an exercise, rather than relying on gravity and free weights.

The kBox has been described in sports media as a Swedish-developed flywheel training device used by professional football clubs and athletes. The device has also been used as exercise equipment in scientific studies on flywheel training and test–retest reliability.

== History ==
The kBox was developed by Exxentric co-founders Fredrik Correa and Mårten Fredriksson.

According to a feature in the Swedish business newspaper Dagens industri, Exxentric developed the kBox following interest in flywheel resistance training methods that had been investigated in a space research context, and the company launched its first kBox product in 2011.

== Usage ==
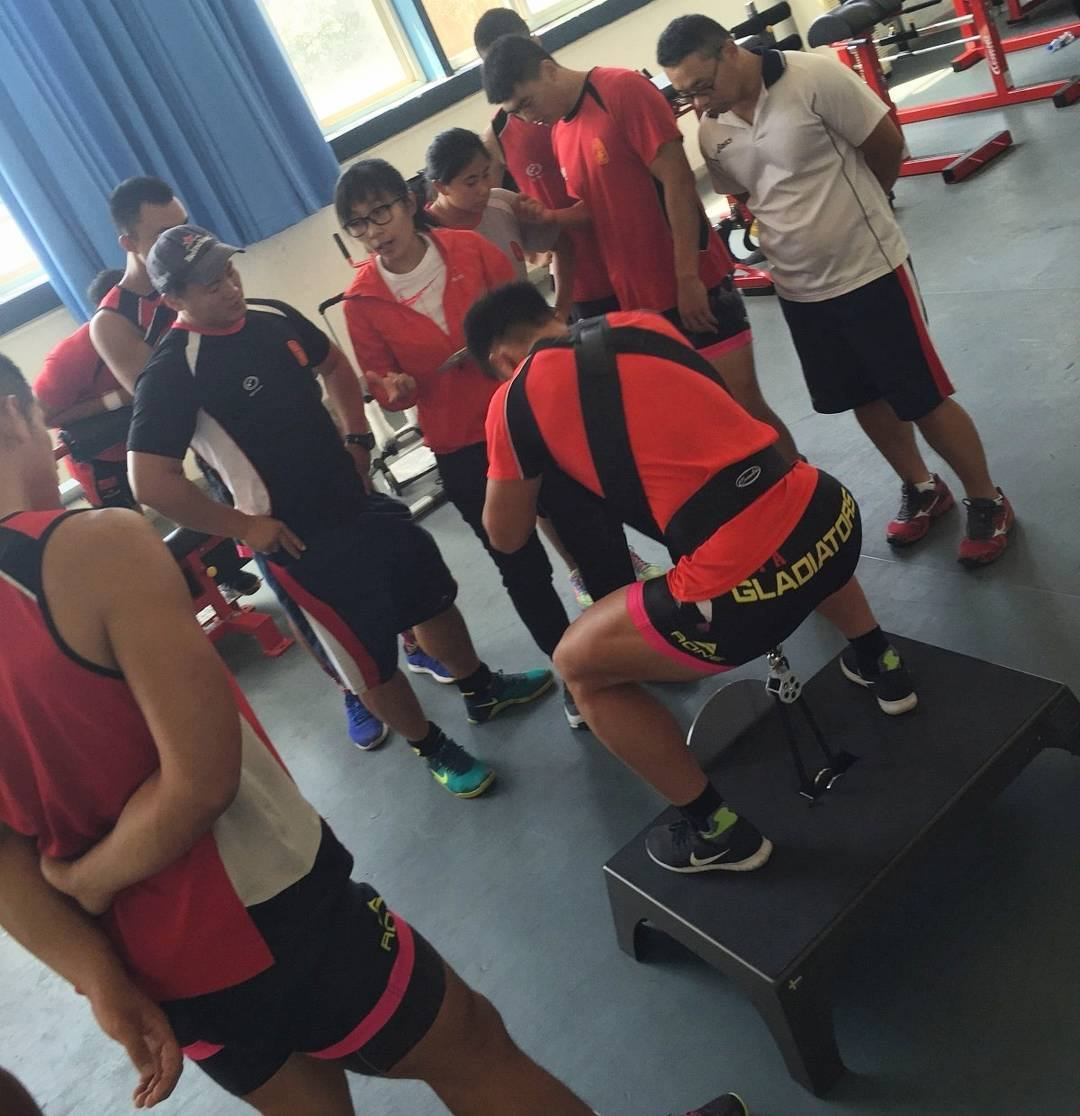
The China national rugby union team using the kBox4 in August 2017.

=== Elite sport ===
Swedish sports coverage has reported that professional clubs including Juventus, Inter, Dynamo Moscow, Palermo and Djurgården have adopted the technology as part of strength training and rehabilitation training, highlighting the device's variable resistance and eccentric loading characteristics.

=== Scientific research ===
Studies in sports science and strength and conditioning research have used Exxentric kBox devices as test platforms for flywheel resistance training protocols. A 2018 study examined unilateral and bilateral eccentric overload flywheel training using a kBox device to assess power and performance outcomes, while a 2020 study assessed the validity and test–retest reliability of performance measurements obtained using an Exxentric kBox4 Pro device across multiple exercises and inertial settings.

Other peer-reviewed studies have examined flywheel resistance training more generally, including investigations of eccentric overload and mechanical outputs during flywheel exercises.

A 2024 master's thesis at the KTH Royal Institute of Technology examined machine learning approaches for exercise detection and activity recognition using Exxentric kBox machines and sensor data collected during flywheel training sessions.

=== Spaceflight ===
kBox has been noted in connection with crewed space missions. In reporting leading up to the Artemis program and the Artemis II mission, astronauts are shown using kBox to enable strength training in microgravity.

== Reception ==
Fitness equipment reviewers have described the kBox as a compact flywheel-based alternative to traditional weight training equipment, noting its emphasis on eccentric loading and its use in strength and conditioning contexts.

Fitness reviewers Cooper Mitchell of Garage Gym Reviews and Joe Gray of Grey Matter Lifting have described the kBox as suitable for home gyms and personal strength training because of its compact design and portability compared with traditional weight training equipment.

== See also ==
- Flywheel training
- Resistance training
