= Adjustment =

Adjustment may refer to:

- Adjustment (law), with several meanings
- Adjustment (psychology), the process of balancing conflicting needs
- Adjustment disorder, a mental disorder defined by a maladaptive response to a psychosocial stressor
- Adjustment of observations, in mathematics, a method of solving an overdetermined system of equations
- Calibration, in metrology
- Spinal adjustment, in chiropractic practice
- In statistics, compensation for confounding variables

== See also ==
- Setting (disambiguation)
