= K-box =

Defunct model of loudspeaker

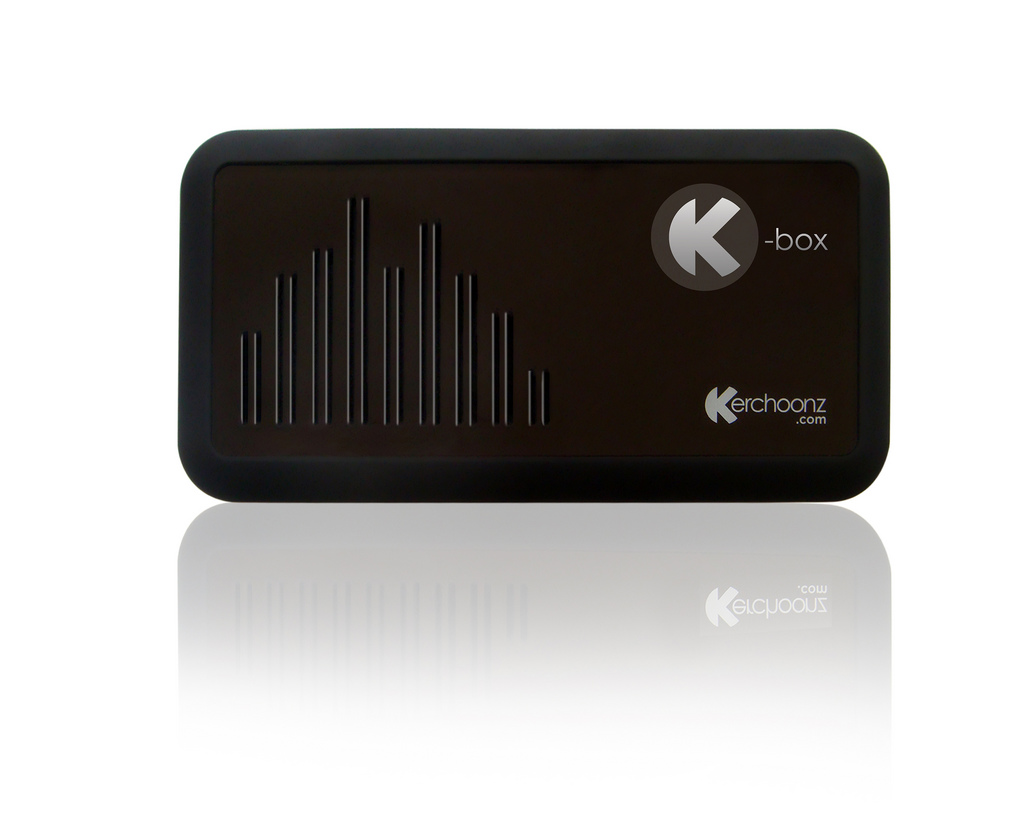
The K-box Gel Audio Speaker

K-box was a small loudspeaker powered by an internal amplifier sold by Kerchoonz.com in 2009.

== Technology ==
When placed onto solid flat surfaces, walls or windows the K-box turns the surface into speakers or sound board. It amplifies and provides stereo sound that is supplied by any audio source that has 3.5mm audio output. The K-box can be utilized with contemporary electronics, like a computer, iPod, iPhone, television, or portable gaming device. The K-box is about the size of a standard cell (mobile) phone. The K-box uses a hybrid technology of standard speaker, delivering mid to high frequencies and a Gel Audio driver (developed by SFX Technologies) delivering low end Bass frequencies. When placed on flat solid surfaces, this technology enhances the bass response via high-intensity vibrations. in order to generate sound and thus improve the volume and audio quality. The K-box gel audio technology has been explained as “hydro-gel” suspension system used to improve the dynamics in comparison to similar speaker products which typically work on transduction.

The K-box is powered by a built-in rechargeable battery with claims of 20 hours of playtime per charge It is recharged via computer USB or 5v adaptor.

STV's Colin Kelly "Gadget Guru" presenter for the television program "The Hour" mentions K-box in his television review as among the best sounds from one of these "boombox" products for taking to the beach. According to the show, the product is made in Scotland.

== Hardware Specs ==
Portable (115 x 55 x 20mm) Up to 20 hours battery life (recharge via USB) Maximum spl is 95 dB, depending on location and surface on which it is placed It has a given frequency response of 40H-20 kHz

== Awards ==
The K-box received an award as runner-up as The Most Valuable Music Therapy Product of 2009 by The Therapy Times in July 2009.

== See also ==
- Loudspeaker
- Loudspeaker enclosure
