= GhostBSD =

Unix-like operating system

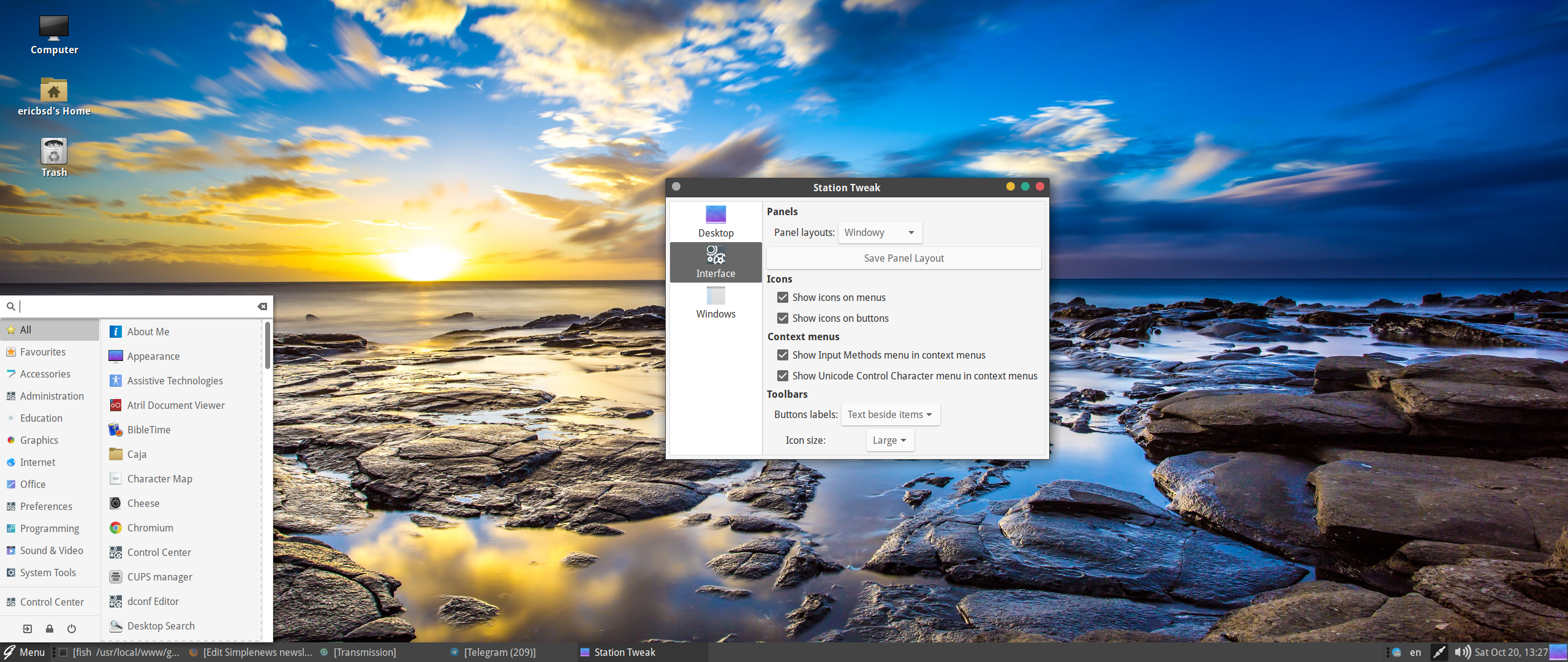
- GhostBSD 18.10 (October 2018) with MATE
- Developer: Eric Turgeon and GhostBSD Team
- OS family: UNIX
- Working state: Current
- Source model: Open source
- Latest release: 26.1-R15.0p2 / 18 April 2026; 5 months ago
- Repository: github.com/ghostbsd/ghostbsd-build
- Supported platforms: amd64
- Kernel type: Monolithic FreeBSD kernel
- Default user interface: MATE and Xfce
- License: FreeBSD license
- Official website: www.ghostbsd.org

GhostBSD is a Unix-like operating system based on FreeBSD for x86-64, with MATE (previously GNOME) as its default desktop environment and an Xfce-desktop community based edition. It aims to be easy to install, ready-to-use and easy to use. The project goal is to combine security, privacy, stability, usability, openness, freedom and to be free of charge.

== History ==
Prior to GhostBSD 18.10, the project was based on FreeBSD. In May 2018 it was announced that future versions of the operating system would be based on TrueOS. In 2020, with the discontinuation of TrueOS, GhostBSD switched back to FreeBSD.

== Version history ==
=== FreeBSD based releases (1.0–11.1) ===
GhostBSD version	Release date	FreeBSD version	Desktop environments	Changes
1.0	March 2010	8.0	GNOME 2.28	First general availability release
1.5	?	8.1	GNOME 2.30	Introduced Compiz support. (This version was also distributed with the January 2011 issue of the German magazine freeX, which also featured an article about the new OS.)
2.0	March 13, 2011	8.2	?	Improvements to GDM et al.
2.5	January 24, 2012	9.0	?	Choice of preconfigured GNOME or LXDE desktop
3.0	March 10, 2013	9.1	?	The last release to deploy the GNOME 2 desktop environment
3.1	June 28, 2013	?	?	A point release primarily to fix bugs
3.5	November 7, 2013	?	MATE 1.6; Xfce 4.10	LibreOffice exchanged for Apache OpenOffice 4.
4.0	October 4, 2014	10.0	?	Various new features
10.1	September 13, 2015	10.1	?	Software additions
10.3	August 31, 2016	10.3	?	ZFS support, UEFI support, ...
11.1	November 16, 2017	11.1	MATE 1.18; Xfce 4.12	GhostBSD Software repositories, dropped i386 support, WhiskerMenu as default menu (Xfce)

=== TrueOS-based releases (18.10–21.01.20) ===
From GhostBSD 18.10 to 21.01.20, the project moved its base from FreeBSD to TrueOS. Following are TrueOS-based GhostBSD releases:

GhostBSD version	Release date	Desktop environment	Changes
18.10	November 1, 2018	MATE 1.20	First release based on TrueOS
19.04	April 13, 2019	MATE 1.22 and Xfce	
19.09	September 16, 2019	MATE and Xfce	Moved from TrueOS CURRENT to STABLE
19.10	October 26, 2019	MATE and Xfce	
20.01	January 22, 2020	MATE and Xfce	
20.03	March 31, 2020	MATE and Xfce	
20.04	August 10, 2020	MATE 1.24 and Xfce	
21.01.20	January 23, 2021		

=== FreeBSD based releases (21.04.27–present) ===
Beginning from GhostBSD 21.04.27, the project has moved its base back to FreeBSD.

GhostBSD version	Release date	Desktop environment	Changes
21.04.27	April 29, 2021		GhostBSD is now based on FreeBSD 13.0-STABLE
21.5.11	May 11, 2021		
21.09.06	September 7, 2021		Switch from OpenRC to FreeBSD rc.d
21.09.08	September 9, 2021		
22.06.15	June 18, 2022		
22.06.18	June 20, 2022		
23.06.01	June 5, 2023		
23.10.01	October 28, 2023	MATE 1.26.0	
24.01.01	February 13, 2024		Based on FreeBSD 14.0-STABLE
24.04.1	May 20, 2024	MATE 1.28.1	Based on FreeBSD 14.0-STABLE
24.07.3	September 12, 2024		
24.10.1	November 17, 2024		UFS installation support removed from installer
25.01-R14.2p1	February 28, 2025	1.28.2	Now based FreeBSD RELEASE with a new versioning scheme
25.02-R14.3p2	August 25, 2025		Addition of a community-supported GNUstep desktop environment
26.1-R15.0p2	April 18, 2026		Display server now XLibre (X.Org Server before), shell now zsh (fish before)

== License ==
GhostBSD was originally licensed under the 3-clause BSD license ("Revised BSD License", "New BSD License", or "Modified BSD License")

In 2014 Eric Turgeon re-licensed GhostBSD under 2-clause license ("Simplified BSD License" or "FreeBSD License"). GhostBSD contains some GPL-licensed software.

== Recommended system requirements ==
The following are the recommended requirements:

- 2 GHz dual core Intel/AMD 64-bit processor
- 8 GB RAM (system memory for physical and virtualized installs)
- VGA capable of 1024 × 768 screen resolution
- 15 GB of free hard drive space
- Network access

== Reception ==
Jim Salter of Ars Technica concluded that GhostBSD was "... perfectly reasonable choice for a desktop distribution." However, Google Chrome support was unlikely to come anytime soon. Without a specific desire for running BSD he wouldn't recommend the operating system instead of a more mainstream Linux distribution.

== See also ==
- List of BSD operating systems
- Comparison of BSD operating systems
- Darwin (operating system)
- DesktopBSD
- MidnightBSD
- NetBSD
- OpenBSD
