= Bitrig =

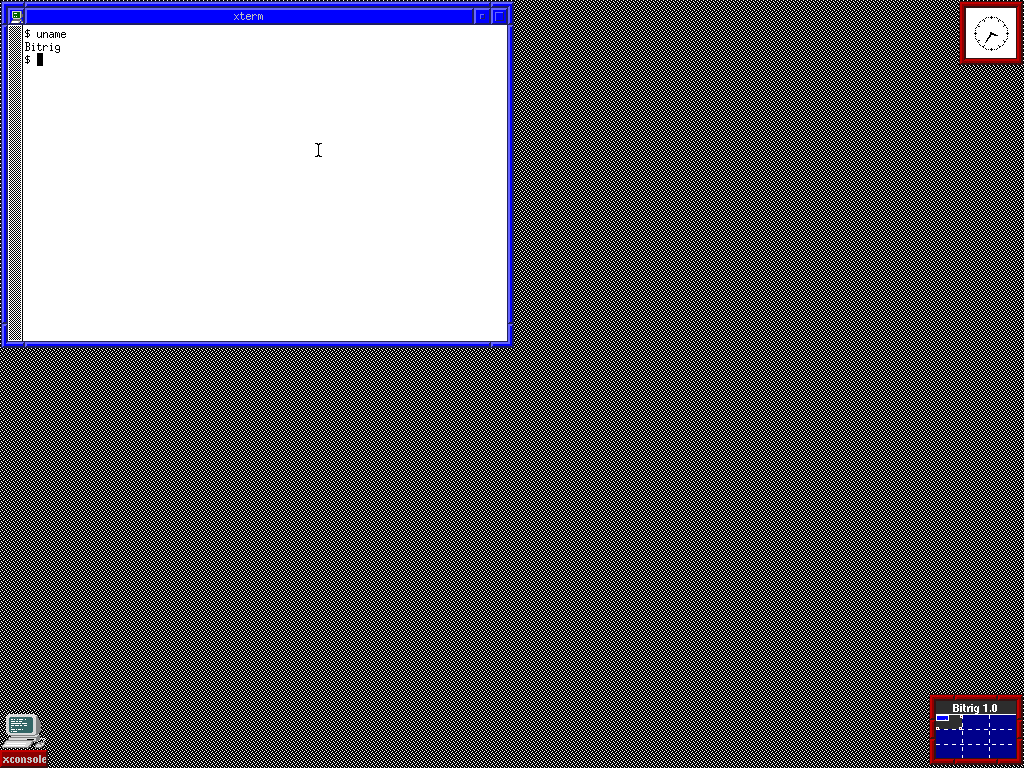
- Default Bitrig desktop
- Developer: Artur Grabowski, Patrick Wildt, Christiano F. Haesbaert, John C. Vernaleo, Pedro Martelletto, Martin Natano, Owain G. Ainsworth, Thordur Bjornsson, Dale Rahn, Marco Peereboom, Christophe Prevotaux
- OS family: BSD
- Working state: Discontinued
- Source model: Open source
- Initial release: 1.0 / 25 November 2014
- Latest release: 1.0 / 25 November 2014; 11 years ago
- Package manager: Bitrig ports/packages
- Supported platforms: amd64, armv7
- Kernel type: Monolithic kernel
- License: ISC license
- Official website: Bitrig at the Wayback Machine (archived 2023-12-12)

Bitrig was an OpenBSD-based operating system targeted exclusively at the amd64 and armv7 platforms.

It is no longer being developed, and some of the work that it had done was merged back into OpenBSD. Some of its achievements included porting FUSE/puffs support, libc++ to the platform to replace libstdc++, PIE support for AMD64 and NDB kernel support.

Bitrig focused on using modern tools such as Git and LLVM/Clang along with only focusing on modern platforms.

It aimed to have a "commercially friendly code base", with texinfo being the only GNU tool in the base system. GPT partitioning was supported by Bitrig, and future plans included support for virtualisation and EFI.
