= AdJ =

adJ - Aprendiendo de Jesús
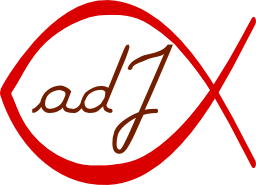
- Developer: Proyecto Pasos de Jesús
- OS family: Unix-like (BSD)
- Working state: Current
- Source model: Open source
- Initial release: 2005
- Latest release: 7.8 / April 25, 2026; 7 days ago
- Available in: Spanish
- Update method: Every 6 months
- Package manager: OpenBSD package tools and ports tree
- Supported platforms: x86-64
- Kernel type: Monolithic
- Userland: BSD
- Default user interface: Modified pdksh, fluxbox for X11
- License: ISC, BSD, Other OpenBSD Licenses
- Official website: aprendiendo.pasosdeJesus.org

AdJ (Aprendiendo de Jesús) is a distribution of OpenBSD for Spanish speakers. The source code is available in GitLab.

Its main technical difference with OpenBSD is that it implements locale (POSIX standard) and xlocale to support internationalization and localization in C and C++. It includes tables for classification, comparison, numerical formats, monetary formats and date formats for all the Spanish speaking countries.

The documentation is divided in 3 books:

- basico_adJ with basic concepts of Unix and the usage of adJ remotely via ssh
- usuario_adJ for people who installs the system and use it in their desktop
- servidor_adJ for people who wants to use adJ as firewall or server

The installation process of the base system is the same one of OpenBSD (but in spanish), the rest of packages and configuration is done with the script `/inst_adJ.sh`, see details in the documentation

== Release history ==
Each version is based on the corresponding version of the sources of OpenBSD.

Version	Release date
3.6	January 20, 2005
3.7	September 1, 2005
3.8	September 13, 2006
3.9	June 9, 2007
4.0	August 15, 2007
4.1	November 7, 2007
4.2	May 28, 2008
4.3	June 1, 2009
4.4	August 26, 2009
4.6	March 20, 2010
4.7	September 22, 2010
4.8	April 1, 2011
4.9	November 12, 2011
5.0	July 2, 2012
5.1	October 25, 2012
5.2	February 23, 2013
5.3	September 26, 2013
5.4p1	April 13, 2014
5.5	September 19, 2014
5.6	April 22, 2015
5.7	October 15, 2015
5.8	April 25, 2016
5.9	September 14, 2016
6.0	February 15, 2017
6.1	September 12, 2017
6.2	February 2, 2018
6.3	August 21, 2018
6.4	March 12, 2019
6.5	September 15, 2019
6.6	March 26, 2020
6.7	October 5, 2020
6.8	March 28, 2021
6.9	September 22, 2021
7.0	March 3, 2022
7.1	September 10, 2022
7.2	January 17, 2023
7.3	September 28, 2023
7.4	February 22, 2024
7.5	July 22, 2024
7.6	February 15, 2025
7.7	August 19, 2025
7.8	April 25, 2025

This distribution has been cited by a number of independent authors.
