= FreeSBIE =

Operating system

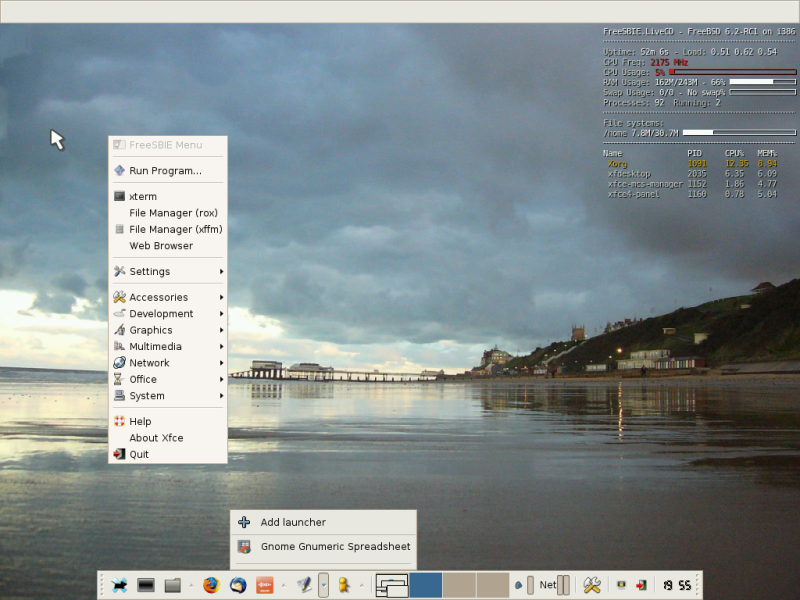
- FreeSBIE 2.0 with Xfce environment
- OS family: FreeBSD
- Working state: Unmaintained
- Source model: Open source
- Latest release: 2.0.1 / February 2, 2007
- Kernel type: Monolithic
- License: Mostly BSD
- Official website: www.freesbie.org

FreeSBIE is a live CD, an operating system that is able to load directly from a bootable CD with no installation process or hard disk. It is based on the FreeBSD operating system. Its name is a pun on frisbee. Currently, FreeSBIE uses Xfce and Fluxbox.

FreeSBIE 1.0 was based on FreeBSD 5.2.1 and released on February 27, 2004. The first version of FreeSBIE 2 was developed during the summer of 2005, thanks to the Google Summer of Code. FreeSBIE 2.0.1, which is a complete rewrite of the so-called toolkit, is based on FreeBSD 6.2 and was released on February 10, 2007. According to DistroWatch the FreeSBIE project is discontinued.

== Goals ==
The goals of the FreeSBIE project are:

- To develop a suite of programs to be used to create one's own CD, with all the personalizations desired
- To make various ISO images available, each with its different goals and possible uses

== See also ==
- Comparison of BSD operating systems
