= MidnightBSD =

Operating system

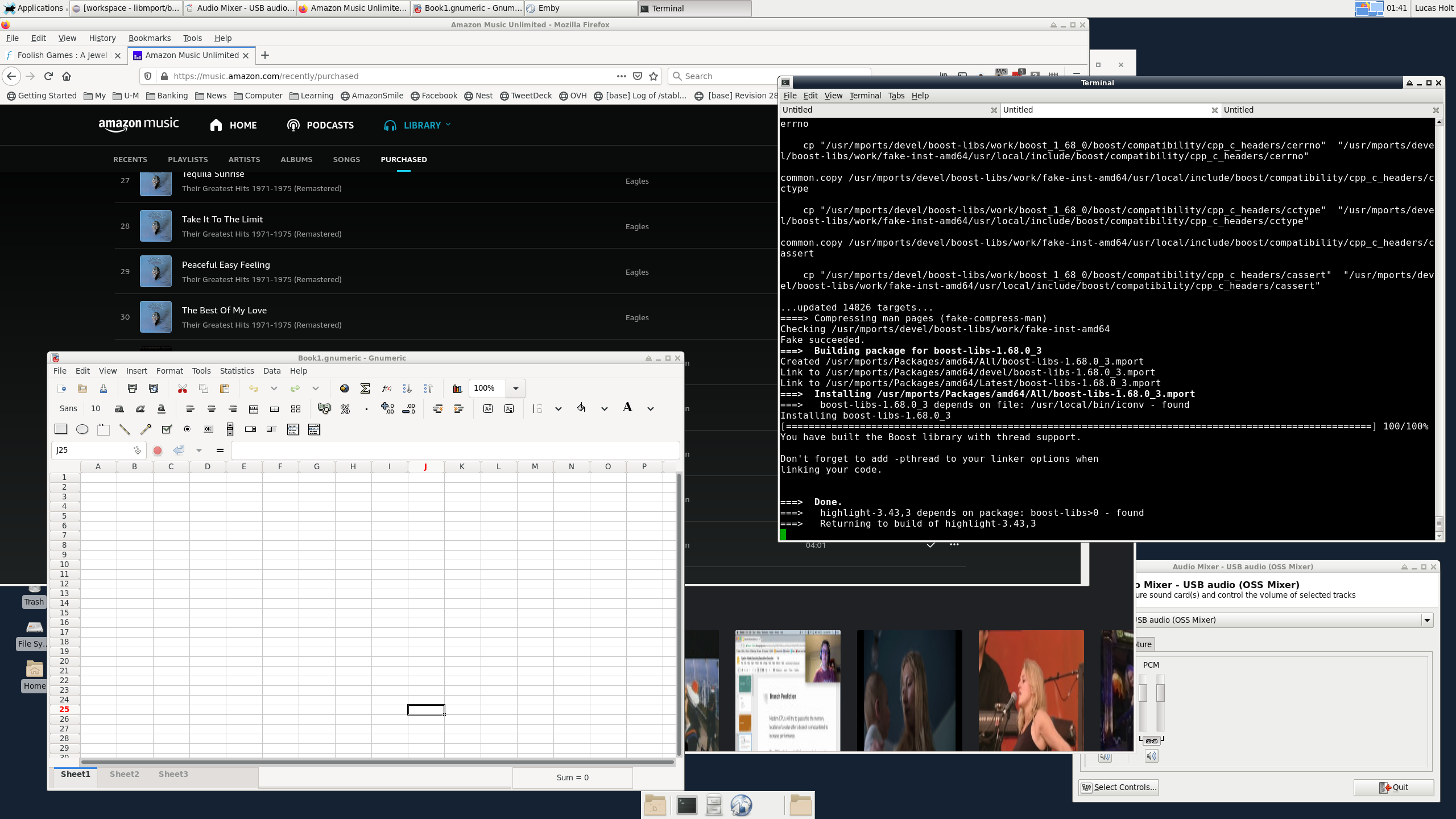
- MidnightBSD 2.0
- Developer: The MidnightBSD project
- Written in: C
- OS family: FreeBSD
- Working state: Current
- Source model: Source-available
- Initial release: 0.1 / 6 August 2007
- Latest release: 4.0.6 / 19 June 2026; 3 months ago
- Repository: github.com/midnightbsd/src
- Marketing target: PC, Workstations, Servers
- Package manager: MidnightBSD mports/Packages
- Supported platforms: x86-64 and IA-32
- Kernel type: Monolithic kernel
- Userland: FreeBSD
- Default user interface: Xfce
- License: Modified FreeBSD license, Proprietary
- Official website: www.midnightbsd.org

MidnightBSD is a formerly free Unix-like, desktop-oriented operating system originally forked from FreeBSD 6.1, and periodically updated with code and drivers from later FreeBSD releases. Its default desktop environment, Xfce, is a lightweight user friendly desktop experience.

== History and development ==
MidnightBSD began as a fork from FreeBSD in 2005. The founder of the project, Lucas Holt, wished to create a BSD derived desktop operating system. He was familiar with several live CD projects, but not the work on TrueOS or DesktopBSD. At the same time, he also had an interest in GNUstep. The two ideas were folded into a plan to create a user friendly desktop environment. MidnightBSD 0.1 was released based on the efforts of Lucas Holt, Caryn Holt, D. Adam Karim, Phil Pereira of bsdnexus, and Christian Reinhardt. This release features a modified version of the FreeBSD ports system. The ports system evolved into "mports" which includes fake support, generation of packages before installation, license tagging, and strict rules about package list generation and modification of files outside the destination. Many of these features were introduced in MidnightBSD 0.1.1.

Christian Reinhardt replaced Phil Pereira as the lead "mports" maintainer prior to the release of MidnightBSD 0.1. D. Adam Karim acted as the security officer for the first release. All release engineering is handled by Lucas Holt.

0.2 introduced a refined imports system with over 2000 packages. The Portable C Compiler was added on i386 in addition to the GNU Compiler Collection. Other changes include enabling ipfw and sound card detection on startup, newer versions of many software packages including Bind, GCC, OpenSSH, and Sendmail, as well as a Live CD creation system.

== Etymology ==
MidnightBSD is named after Lucas and Caryn Holt's cat, Midnight, a ten-pound black Turkish Angora.

== License ==
MidnightBSD is released under several licenses. The kernel code and most newly created code are released under the two-clause BSD license. There are parts under the GPL, LGPL, ISC, and Beerware licenses, along with three- and four-clause BSD licenses.

Due to the Digital Age Assurance Act, a California law that will take effect on January 1, 2027, and which requires developers of proprietary (Windows, macOS, iOS, Android) and open-source (AOSP, Linux, BSD) operating systems to integrate age declaration at the operating system level, MidnightBSD has modified its license such that California residents are prohibited from using MidnightBSD as their desktop operating system, which makes it non-free. Additionally, in response to Brazilian Law No. 15,211 of September 17, 2025 (also known as the Digital Statute of the Child and the Adolescent) which took effect on March 17, 2026, MidnightBSD updated its license to prohibit its use as a desktop operating system by residents of Brazil.

However, not much later, the daemon aged was added to the system, which provides the age declaration required in California.

== Reception ==
Michael Plura from Heise said it is extremely hard to configure a MidnightBSD distribution without even a desktop. He pointed to the dev vlog and said the developer himself showed the difficulty of providing a desktop OS as a solo developer.

Jesse Smith reviewed MidnightBSD 0.6 in 2015 for DistroWatch Weekly:

I found using MidnightBSD strange. While the low level tools and general environment felt familiar to me as a FreeBSD user, there were frequently pieces of the experience missing. MidnightBSD has virtually none of FreeBSD's extensive documentation, which may not have been a problem when the project originally forked from FreeBSD, but now MidnightBSD has diverged enough that it really should have its own Handbook. MidnightBSD offers some of the same ports as its parent, but has fallen about 20,000 packages behind. Further, according to the MidnightBSD website, the project aims to provide a beginner-friendly, desktop-oriented operating system, similar to FreeBSD. However, from my experiences this past week, it seems as though MidnightBSD lags behind GhostBSD, PC-BSD and even FreeBSD in providing a newcomer-friendly platform. A few years ago tools like mport might have been quite welcome to FreeBSD users, but now pkg fills that role in the FreeBSD community. In short, I feel that MidnightBSD, while it began with promise and admirable goals, has fallen behind in technology, user experience and documentation.
