= TrueOS =

Unix-like, desktop-oriented operating system

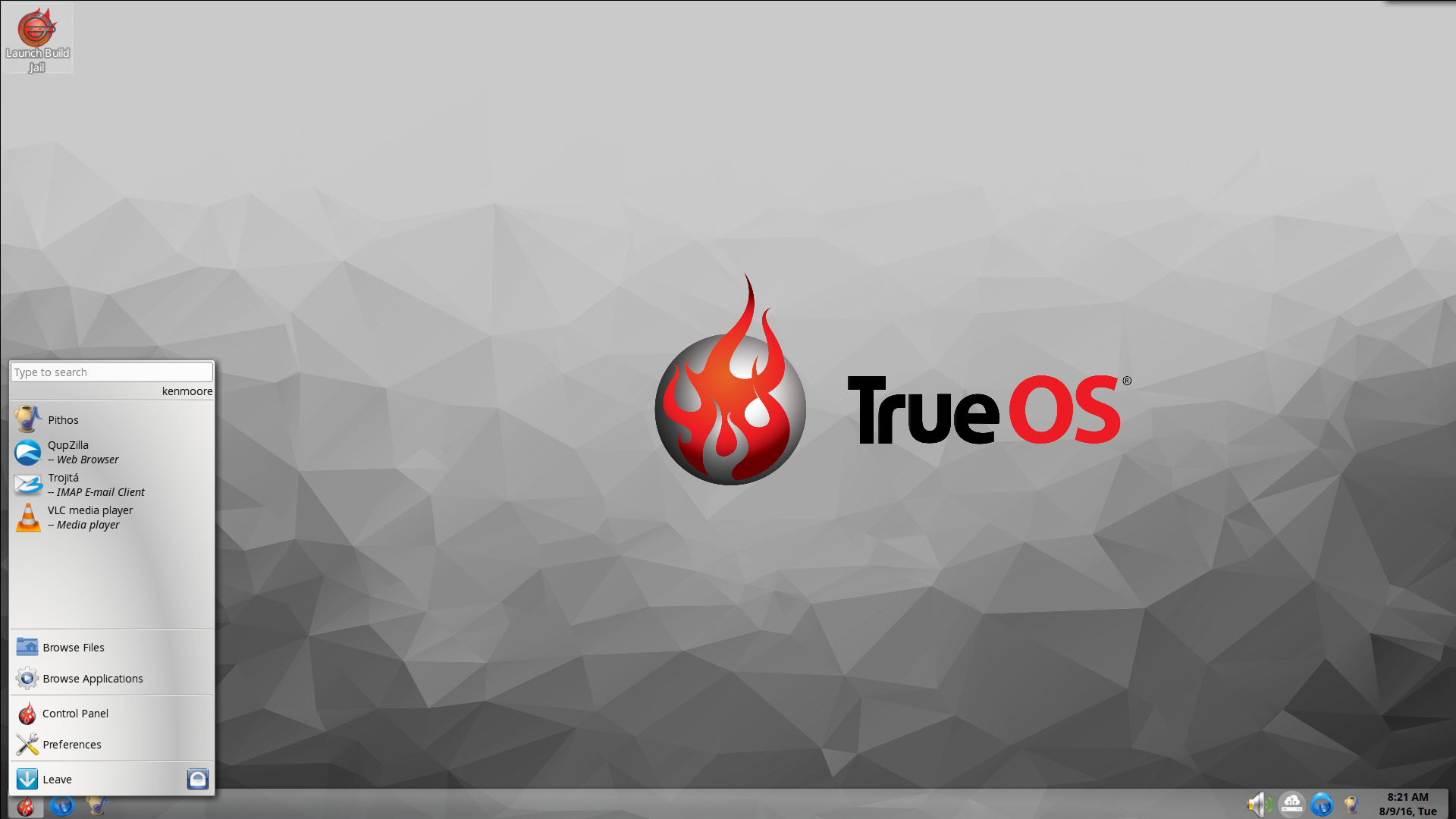
- Lumina desktop running on TrueOS
- Developer: iXsystems
- OS family: Unix-like
- Working state: Discontinued
- Source model: Open source
- Initial release: 2006; 20 years ago
- Latest release: Rolling release (UNSTABLE), based on FreeBSD-CURRENT; Long-term support (STABLE) every 0.5 years, based on FreeBSD-STABLE; 18.12 / December 15, 2018; 7 years ago
- Package manager: FreeBSD Ports/Packages (command line frontend); .txz (package format)
- Supported platforms: amd64 (default); armv7 (Pico)
- Kernel type: Monolithic (FreeBSD)
- Default user interface: Lumina
- License: BSD
- Official website: trueos.org

TrueOS (formerly PC-BSD or PCBSD) is a discontinued Unix-like, server-oriented operating system built upon the most recent releases of FreeBSD-CURRENT.

Up to 2018, it aimed to be easy to install by using a graphical installation program, and easy and ready-to-use immediately by providing KDE SC, Lumina, LXDE, MATE, or Xfce as the desktop environment. In June 2018, the developers announced that since TrueOS had become the core OS to provide a basis for other projects, the graphical installer had been removed. Graphical end-user-oriented OSes formerly based on TrueOS were GhostBSD and Trident. TrueOS provided official binary Nvidia and Intel drivers for hardware acceleration and an optional 3D desktop interface through KWin, and Wine is ready-to-use for running Microsoft Windows software. TrueOS was also able to run Linux software in addition to FreeBSD Ports collection and it had its own .txz package manager. TrueOS supported OpenZFS and the installer offered disk encryption with geli.

Development of TrueOS ended in 2020.

== History ==
TrueOS was founded by FreeBSD professional Kris Moore in early 2005 as PC-BSD. In August 2006 it was voted the most beginner-friendly operating system by OSWeekly.com.

The first beta of the PC-BSD consisted of only a GUI installer to get the user up and running with a FreeBSD 6 system with KDE3 pre-configured. This was a major innovation for the time as anyone wishing to install FreeBSD would have to manually tweak and run through a text installer. Kris Moore's goal was to make FreeBSD easy for everyone to use on the desktop and has since diverged even more in the direction of usability by including additional GUI administration tools and .pbi application installers. PC-BSD's application installer management involved a different approach to installing software than many other Unix-like operating systems, up to and including version 8.2, by means of the pbiDIR website. Instead of using the FreeBSD Ports tree directly (although it remained available), PC-BSD used files with the .pbi filename extension (Push Button Installer) which, when double-clicked, brought up an installation wizard program. An autobuild system tracked the FreeBSD ports collection and generated new .pbi files daily. All software packages and dependencies were installed from inside of the .pbi files into their own self-contained directories in /Programs. This convention was aimed to decrease confusion about where binary programs reside, and to remove the possibility of a package breaking if system libraries are upgraded or changed, and to prevent dependency hell.

On October 10, 2006, PC-BSD was acquired by enterprise hardware provider iXsystems. iXsystems employed Kris Moore as a full-time developer and leader of the project. In November 2007, iXsystems entered into a distribution agreement with Fry's Electronics whereby Fry's Electronics stores nationwide carry boxed copies of PC-BSD version 1.4 (Da Vinci Edition). In January 2008, iXsystems entered into a similar agreement with Micro Center.

On September 1, 2016, the PC-BSD team announced that the name of the operating system would change to TrueOS. Along with the rebranding, the project also became a rolling release distribution, based on the FreeBSD-CURRENT branch.

On November 15, 2016, TrueOS began the transition from FreeBSD's rc.d to OpenRC as the default init system. Apart from Gentoo/Alt, where OpenRC was initially developed, this is the only other major BSD based operating system using OpenRC.

In July 2018, TrueOS announced that they would spin off the desktop edition into a separate project named Project Trident.

Development of TrueOS ended in 2020 and the developers recommended users move to other BSD-based operating systems.

== Release history ==
Version	Release date	FreeBSD codebase
1.0	April 29, 2006	6.0
1.1	May 29, 2006	6.1
1.2	July 12, 2006	6.1
1.3	December 31, 2006	6.1
1.4	September 24, 2007	6.2-STABLE
1.4.1.x	Various	6.3-PRERELEASE
1.5	March 12, 2008	6.3-STABLE
1.5.1	April 23, 2008	6.3-STABLE
7.0	September 16, 2008	7.0-STABLE
7.0.1	October 17, 2008	7.0-STABLE
7.0.2	December 10, 2008	7.1-PRERELEASE
7.1	April 10, 2009	7.2-PRERELEASE
7.1.1	July 6, 2009	7.2-STABLE
8.0	February 23, 2010	8.0-RELEASE-P2
8.1	July 21, 2010	8.1-RELEASE
8.2	February 24, 2011	8.2
9.0	January 13, 2012	9.0
9.1	December 18, 2012	9.1
9.2	October 7, 2013	9.2-CURRENT
10.0	January 29, 2014	10.0
10.1	November 14, 2014	10.1
10.2	August 21, 2015	10.2
10.3	April 4, 2016	10.3
TrueOS 11.0	September 1, 2016	FreeBSD-CURRENT
TrueOS 2017-02-22	February 22, 2017	FreeBSD-CURRENT
TrueOS 2017-06-01	June 2, 2017	FreeBSD-CURRENT
TrueOS 17.12	December 14, 2017	FreeBSD-CURRENT
TrueOS 18.03	March 30, 2018	FreeBSD-CURRENT

Since version 7, PC-BSD began following the same numbering system as FreeBSD.

Since version 9.0, the KDE SC, customized to support tighter application integration and the .txz package management system, was no longer the only desktop environment supported by PC-BSD. While manual installation of other desktops such as Xfce and GNOME had been technically possible in earlier releases, none of these were supported in the earlier versions, and major functionality was lost when not using PC-BSD's special build of KDE SC. Starting with version 9.0, PC-BSD added other desktop environments, including GNOME, Xfce, LXDE, and MATE.

PC-BSD used to support both amd64 and i686 architectures. Support for i686 was dropped in version 9.2.

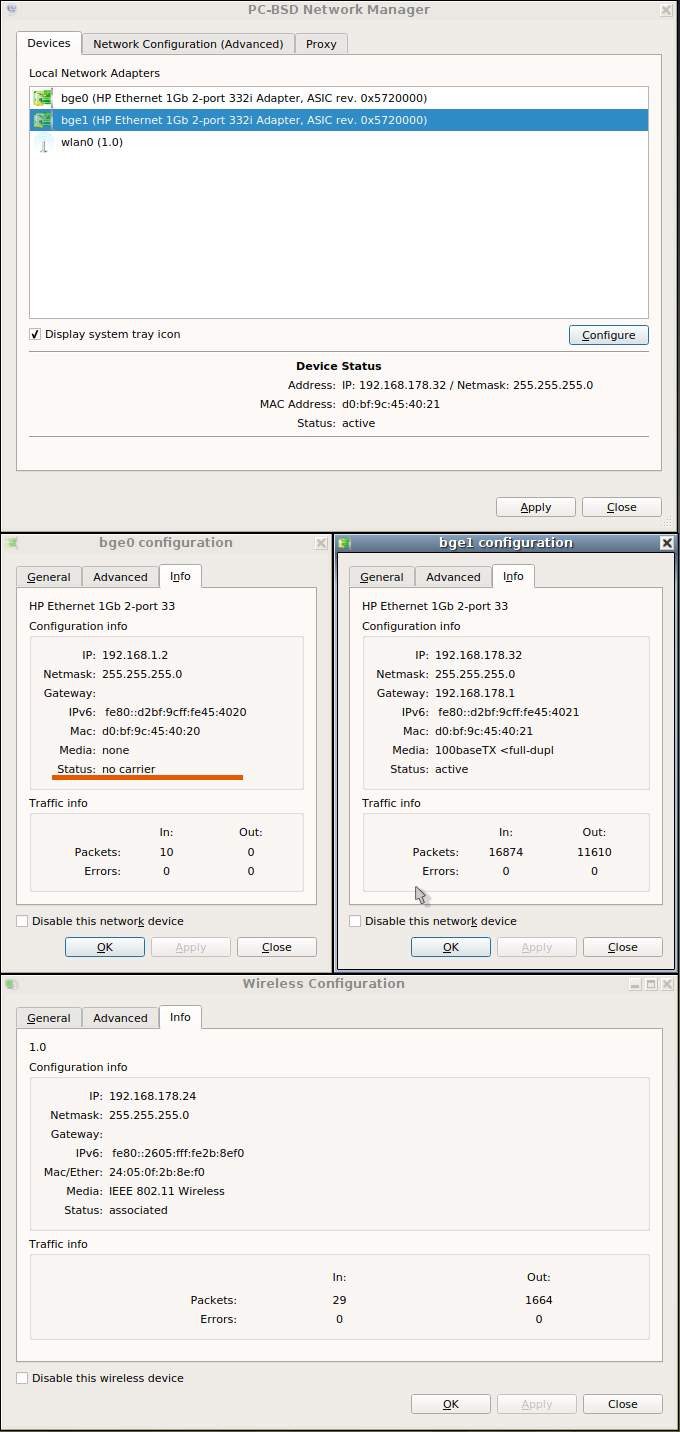
no carrier (underlined red) status message shown in widgets of a PC-BSD 10.1.2 network manager (running on MATE). Three network interface widgets (2 Ethernet and 1 Wi-Fi) showing two network interfaces being up, one being down with no cable plugged in (hence: "no carrier").

Starting in September 2016 with the rebranding of PC-BSD, TrueOS became a rolling release distribution based on FreeBSD's current branch.

== Package management ==
TrueOS's package manager takes a similar approach to installing software to many other Unix-like operating systems. Instead of using the FreeBSD Ports tree directly (although it remains available), TrueOS uses files with the .txz filename extension packages which contain compiled ports. An autobuild system tracked the FreeBSD ports collection and generated new .txz files daily.

The TrueOS package management system aims to be visually similar to that of major operating systems such as Microsoft Windows and Apple macOS, where applications are installed from a single download link with graphical prompts, while maintaining internally the traditional .txz package management systems that many Unix-like systems use. The TrueOS package manager also takes care of creating categorized links in the KDE menu and on the KDE SC desktop.

== Lumina Desktop ==
In 2014, the PC-BSD project announced its development of a new desktop environment, from scratch, named Lumina. Ken Moore is the main developer of Lumina, which is based on the Qt toolkit.

As of July 2016, Lumina has its own web site.

The desktop environment is not an application development toolkit, and aims to be a graphical interface that only uses plugins for customization.

== License ==
TrueOS was originally licensed under the GNU General Public License (GPL) because the developers were under the impression that applications using the Qt, which TrueOS uses for its interface development, must be licensed under the GPL or the Q Public License. Upon discovering that there was, in fact, no such restriction, the TrueOS developers later relicensed the code under a BSD-like 3-clause license.

TrueOS and the TrueOS logo are registered trademarks of iXsystems Inc.

== Hardware requirements ==
The New York City *BSD User Group runs a service named dmesgd, which provides user-submitted dmesg information for different computer hardware (laptops, workstations, single-board computers, embedded systems, virtual machines, etc.) capable of running TrueOS.

According to the TrueOS wiki, TrueOS has the following hardware requirements:

=== Minimum ===
- amd64 processor
- 1 GiB of RAM
- 20 GiB free hard drive space
- Network card

=== Recommended ===
- amd64 processor
- EFI system partition for installation of rEFInd
- 4 GiB of RAM
- 30 GiB of free hard drive space on a primary partition for a desktop installation, or 20 GiB for a server installation
  - 50 GiB is recommended for installations with backup services
- 3D accelerated video card
- Network card
- Sound card

=== UEFI ===
UEFI support (for amd64 only) has been added to the installer and the boot manager since version 10.1 with the default EFI boot manager to be rEFInd. This includes ACPI detection and setup of Root System Description Pointer (RSDP), eXtended System Descriptor Table (XSDT), and Root System Description Table (RSDT) pass-through values to the kernel. A new installation is needed in order to install UEFI support as it requires the creation of a small FAT partition. The current UEFI does not support secure boot.

== Gallery ==
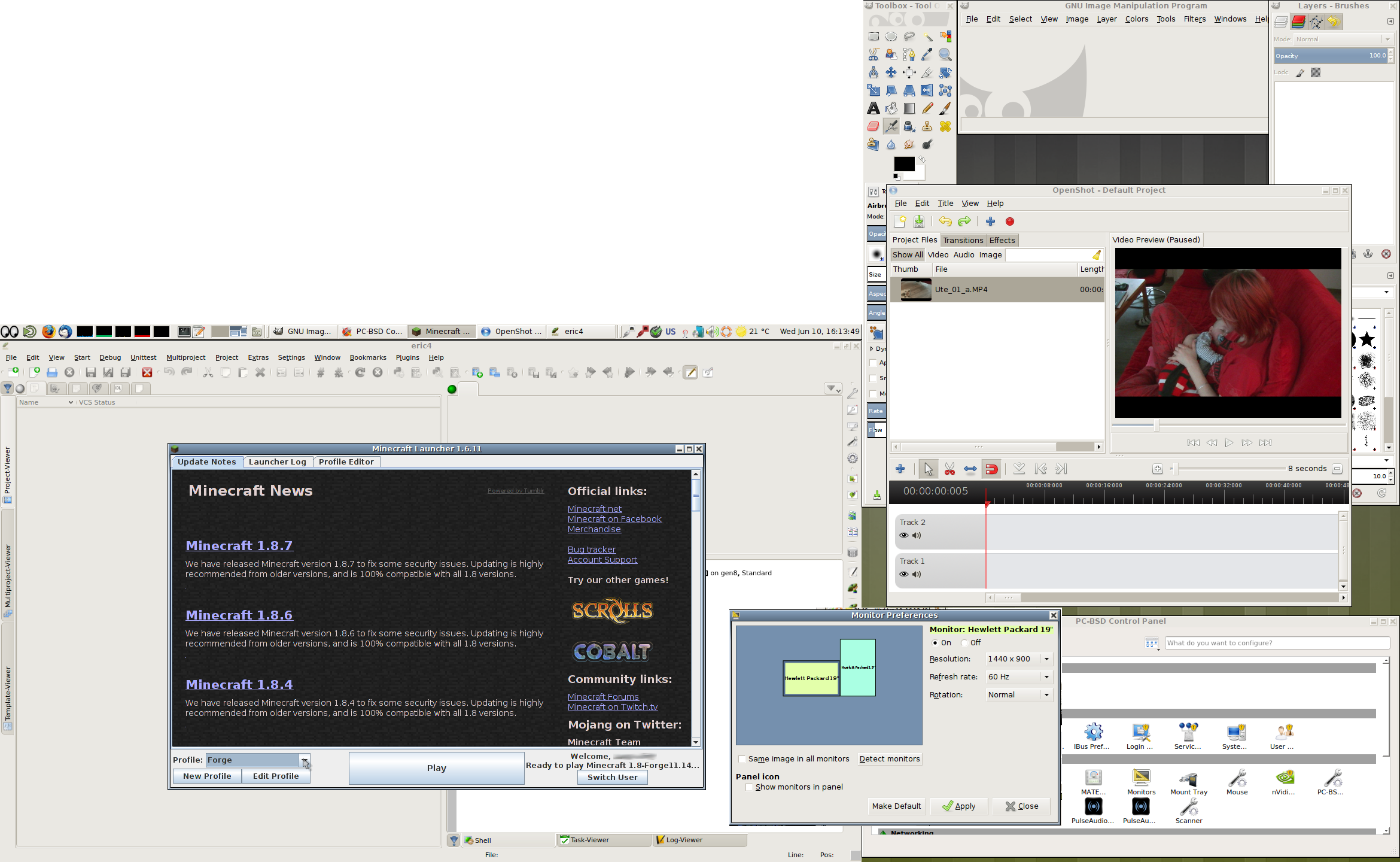
Screenshot of a PC-BSD 10.1.2 desktop (MATE) with dual monitor (dual head, pivot). The running free and open-source (FOSS) programs are: GIMP, OpenShot, file manager, Eric Python development IDE. Also shown: Minecraft 1.8.7 (with "Forge" mods).

== See also ==
- Comparison of BSD operating systems
