= IXsystems =

American computer technology company

iXsystems, Inc.
- Trade name: TrueNAS
- Type: Private
- Industry: Computer hardware
- Predecessor: Berkeley Software Design, Walnut Creek CDROM, Telenet Systems Solutions
- Founder: Michael Lauth, Matt Olander
- Headquarters: San Jose, California, United States
- Number of locations: 2
- Key people: Michael Lauth, Matt Olander, Brett Davis, Kris Moore,
- Products: TrueNAS, TrueOS, Servers
- Website: ixsystems.com

iXsystems, Inc., doing business as TrueNAS, is a privately owned American computer technology company based in San Jose, California that develops, sells and supports computing and storage products and services. Its principal products are customized open source FreeBSD distributions, including the discontinued desktop operating system TrueOS (formerly PC-BSD), the FreeBSD based file servers and network attached storage systems TrueNAS Core (previously FreeNAS) and TrueNAS Enterprise, and the Linux based TrueNAS SCALE. It also markets hardware platforms for these products, and develops enterprise-scale storage architectures and converged infrastructures. As part of its activities, the company has strong ties to the FreeBSD community, has repeatedly donated hardware and support to fledgling projects within the BSD community, and sponsors and develops development within FreeBSD, as well as being a sponsor and attendee of open-source community events.

== History ==
iXsystems was founded in 1991 as Berkeley Software Design, Inc. (BSDI, later BSDi) by Rick Adams and members of the University of California, Berkeley Computer Systems Research Group (CSRG), including Keith Bostic, Kirk McKusick, Mike Karels, Bill Jolitz and Donn Seeley. In the year 2000, Berkeley Software Design, Inc. acquired enterprise server manufacturer Telenet System Solutions, Inc., which was founded in 1996 and operated from the same San Jose, California office and manufacturing facility that iXsystems operates today. In 2001, BSDi sold its operating systems business to Wind River Systems and spun off its hardware business and iXtreme line of servers as iXsystems, Inc. In 2002, OffMyServer, Inc., owned by two BSDi employees, acquired iXsystems, Inc. and operated it as OffMyServer, Inc. until restoring the iXsystems name in 2005.

In 2006, iXsystems adopted the PC-BSD project and hired its founder, Kris Moore. In 2007, iXsystems acquired FreeBSD Mall, Inc., reuniting all the portions of the original BSDi that had been spun off to Wind River Systems. In 2009, iXsystems negotiated to continue the FreeNAS project when its developers decided to move it to Debian Linux. iXsystems introduced a comprehensive rewrite of FreeNAS in 2011 which now provides the platform for the "FreeNAS Mini" SMB NAS arrays and "TrueNAS" enterprise storage arrays. In August 2010, BSD author Dru Lavigne joined iXsystems and in July 2013, Jordan K. Hubbard, one of the founders of the FreeBSD project, joined iXsystems as CTO.

On June 25, 2025, iXsystems made public that it is henceforth doing business as TrueNAS.

== Products and services ==
=== Servers ===
iXsystems designs, sells and supports custom x86 servers for workgroups through data centers with a focus on support for the FreeBSD operating system. All iXsystems servers are subjected to a three-day burn-in process to reduce returns and are available with Linux as an alternative operating system.

=== TrueNAS ===
TrueNAS is the brand for ixSystems' open source network attached storage platform. It includes:

- TrueNAS Legacy (previously CORE/FreeNAS) - a free file server and expandable platform based on FreeBSD.
- TrueNAS (previously SCALE) - a Linux based hyperconverged version of the TrueNAS platform.
- TrueNAS Enterprise - an enterprise file server for commercial use, based on SCALE.
- TrueNAS branded hardware - enterprise storage arrays, a network-attached storage (NAS) systems, storage area network (SAN) devices, and High Availability systems, with up to 10 petabytes raw capacity.

The FreeNAS project was originally launched by third party developers in October 2005 and aimed to create an open source network attached storage system based on FreeBSD 6.0. In September 2009, the development team concluded that the project, then at release 0.7, required a complete rewrite to accommodate modern features such as a plug-in architecture, and the project gradually forked, with a new version based on Debian Linux, and the existing version being transferred to iXsystems, who rewrote it with a new architecture based on FreeBSD 8.1, releasing FreeNAS 8 Beta in November 2010.

On November 19, 2010, iXsystems released FreeNAS 8 Beta, its first release of the popular free and open-source software-defined storage project that it adopted and rewrote. FreeNAS is based on the FreeBSD operating system and the OpenZFS file system.

On August 3, 2011, iXsystems introduced the TrueNAS line of enterprise storage arrays, a network-attached storage (NAS) system and storage area network (SAN) device that supports the SMB, AFP, NFS, iSCSI, SSH, rsync and FTP/TFTP sharing protocols over Ethernet and Fibre Channel network fabrics. TrueNAS also supports vendor-certified protocols including VMware VAAI, Microsoft CSV, ODX, and VSS, and Veeam. A custom, tool-less enclosure provides TrueNAS High Availability using dual controllers, and four user-serviceable components: disks, power supplies, fans and the controllers themselves. TrueNAS uses the OpenZFS file system in hybrid and all-flash configurations up to 10 petabytes in raw capacity.

On March 15, 2020, iXsystems announced the merging of FreeNAS and TrueNAS into a unified product with two editions. TrueNAS CORE would be the rebranded continuation of FreeNAS, as a free, open-source option, and TrueNAS Enterprise would continue as a paid, closed-source option with additional enterprise-focused features. Additionally a Linux port of TrueNAS was under development, to be known as TrueNAS SCALE.

==== FreeNAS Certified ====
The iXsystems FreeNAS Certified line of small and medium-sized enterprise storage arrays are designed to run the FreeNAS storage operating system and are available in 1U, 2U and 4U configurations.

==== TrueNAS Mini and Mini XL ====
The iXsystems TrueNAS Mini line of SOHO storage arrays are designed to run the TrueNAS storage operating system and are available in 4 bay and 8 bay configurations.

Powered by TrueNAS

TrueNAS has announced an Initiative called "Powered by TrueNAS" with First Partner HexOS (Eshtek Inc.),

HexOS is marketed as a storage solution which targets users looking for "Simple Setup", and other NAS features made easy for installation.

== See also ==
- Lumina (desktop environment)
