= Bob Fabry =

American computer scientist (born 1940)

Robert S. Fabry
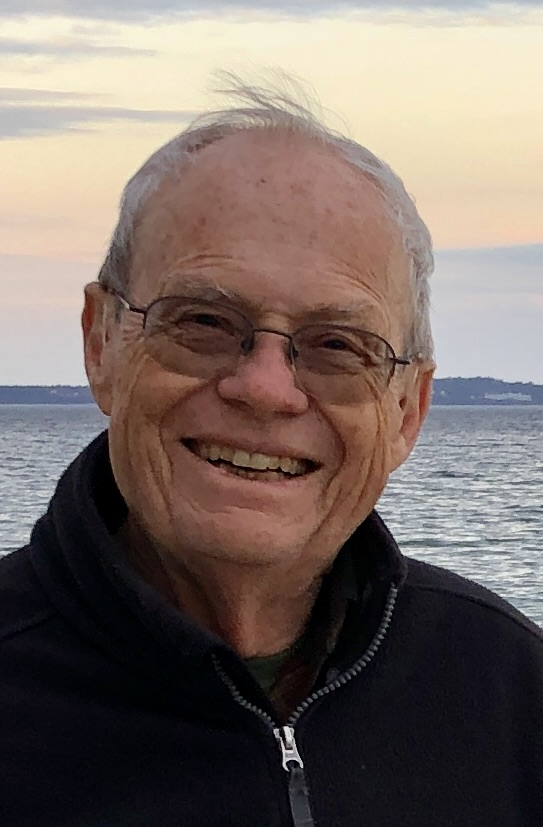
- Born: February 12, 1940 (age 86)
- Education: University of Chicago
- Scientific career
- Fields: Computer science
- Workplaces: University of California, Berkeley
- Thesis: List-structured Addressing (1971)
- Doctoral advisor: Victor Yngve
- Doctoral students: Eric Schmidt
- Other notable students: Eric Allman; Bill Joy; Kirk McKusick

Robert S. Fabry is an American computer scientist and founder of the Computer Systems Research Group (CSRG) at the University of California, Berkeley. He led the effort to provide interactive computing to Berkeley students using Unix. The resulting software became known as Berkeley Unix. He founded the CSRG with an ARPA grant to enhance Berkeley Unix for use in creating the Internet. The resulting software helped spawn the Open source movement, was a factor in the choice of TCP/IP as a world networking standard, and led to a profusion of Unix-like systems including macOS, Linux and FreeBSD.

== MIT CompatibleTime-Sharing System ==
As a graduate student at MIT in 1963 Fabry programmed two commands for MIT's Compatible Time-Sharing System (CTSS): Madbug and Comit. Madbug was a high level debugger for programs written in the MAD programming language. (MAD was the algebraic programming language of choice on CTSS.) Previously, MAD programs could be debugged only at the assembly language level. Comit was a character string manipulation language designed by Fabry's research advisor Victor Yngve.

== Berkeley Unix ==
When Fabry arrived at Berkeley as a professor in 1971 there were no interactive computer facilities for students. Programming classes were taught using decks of punch cards and batch processing on a mainframe computer.

The Unix operating system for PDP-11 computers was introduced at the Symposium on Operating Systems Principles in 1973. Unix provided a low cost path to providing interactive computing to students, and Fabry led the effort to use it at Berkeley. The first instructional Unix system at Berkeley was a PDP-11/45 placed in operation in 1974. Fabry taught the first class using it and then led the effort to have the campus computer center provide Unix services campus-wide.

Berkeley was able to make a number of substantial improvements in its version of Unix, partly because Ken Thompson, who created Unix at Bell Labs and had graduated from Berkeley, was a visiting professor in 1975 and schooled the students and the staff at Berkeley in the code he had written.

This was before AT&T started to market a commercial version of Unix and Bill Joy represented Berkeley in enthusiastically exchanging ideas and code with Bell labs and other groups licensed by AT&T to use Unix, foreshadowing the open source movement.

Meanwhile, ARPA hoped to standardize on a single portable operating system for its contractors. Fabry proposed that Berkeley develop an enhanced version of Berkeley Unix for ARPA and was awarded an 18-month contract beginning in 1980.

Fabry founded CSRG for this purpose and was quickly joined by Joy as project manager and by other students working on projects to improve Berkeley Unix. CSRG was dedicated to putting as much of the software it developed in the public domain as possible, but was limited because it started with software licensed from AT&T.

In 1980, the 4BSD distribution was released. During its nine-month lifetime, nearly 150 copies were shipped to AT&T licensees. Since the AT&T license was on a per-institution basis rather than a per machine basis, the distribution ran on about 500 computers

In 1981, a tuned-up VAX version was released as 4.1BSD and ARPA granted a new two-year contract with goals of speeding up the file system, allowing a multi-megabyte virtual address space, supporting distributed systems, and integrating ARPA's new TCP/IP internet protocol.

Kirk McKusick led the creation of Berkeley Unix's Fast File System. Joy integrated and tuned Rob Gurwitz's TCP/IP stack and with Sam Leffler designed the networking API. The resulting version was released as 4.2BSD in 1983 as Joy and Fabry moved on to other ventures and the administration of CSRG passed to professors Domenico Ferrari and Sue Graham.

Keith Bostic joined CSRG in 1986 and spearheaded the effort to eliminate all the remaining AT&T-licensed code from its distributions, turning them into open-source software. The adoption of TCP/IP as a world standard was facilitated in June 1989 when the Berkeley Unix TCP/IP code was released under a BSD license. CSRG was disbanded in 1995 after a final release which was also freely redistributable under its BSD license.
