= Berkeley Software Design =

American software company

Berkeley Software Design, Inc.
- Industry: Computer software
- Genre: Operating system software
- Founded: 2001
- Founder: Rick Adams, Keith Bostic, Marshall Kirk McKusick, Mike Karels, Bill Jolitz
- Defunct: 2001/2002
- Fate: Acquired
- Successor: Wind River Systems, iXsystems
- Headquarters: U.S.
- Products: BSD/OS
- Website: bsdi.com at the Wayback Machine (archived 1999-04-20)

Berkeley Software Design, Inc. (BSDI or, later, BSDi), was a software company founded in 1991 by members of the Computer Systems Research Group (CSRG), known for developing and selling BSD/OS (originally known as BSD/386), a commercial and partially proprietary variant of the BSD Unix operating system for PCs.

== Creation and BSD/386 ==
BSDI was founded by Rick Adams and members of the Computer Systems Research Group (CSRG) at the University of California, Berkeley, including Keith Bostic, Kirk McKusick, Mike Karels, Bill Jolitz and Donn Seeley. Jolitz, Seeley and Trent Hein were working for Rick Adams's UUNET at the time and became BSDI's first employees when the company began operations in 1991. In December 1991, USENIX Secretary and Former Head of Software at Convex Computer, Rob Kolstad from University of Illinois, was hired and would take over company operations just two years later.

Jolitz, who worked on 386BSD, claimed that he was never officially hired or signed an employment contract with BSDI.

BSD/386 was released in January 1992. The name was chosen for its similarity to BSD ("Berkeley Software Distribution"), the source of its primary product, specifically 4.3BSD Networking Release 2 (Net/2). The full system, including source code retailed at $995, which was more affordable than the equivalent source code license for the rival UNIX System V from AT&T (which cost more than $20,000 in the late 1980s.)

== USL v. BSDI lawsuit ==
In late 1991, AT&T's Unix System Laboratories (USL) brought a lawsuit against BSDI, alleging that BSD/386 contained their proprietary trade secrets and source code. When USL were acquired by Novell, a settlement was reached in January 1994. BSDI agreed to base future releases of the product, now called BSD/OS, on the CSRG's 4.4BSD-Lite release which was declared free of any USL intellectual property. Rob Kolstad (of the University of Illinois and Convex Computer Corporation) was president of BSDI during this period and headed the company until the close of the decade.

== Usage in infrastructure ==
Under Rob Kolstad's direction, the company decided to pursue internet infrastructure as their primary customer audience. In the mid 1990s the top-10 websites in the world were almost all using BSD/386 as their BSD source codebase.

In the 1995 a survey of datacenter software platforms disclosed that BSDI was the #1 software used in data centers, by Internet servers. BSDI subsequently released an "Internet Server" version of their software, in contrast to the desktop version, which focused on providing the maximum number of open-source server products in the base distribution.

== Mergers and sale ==
In 1999, the BSDI employees sought an initial public offering and installed a new president to reach this goal as soon as possible given the recent success of the Red Hat IPO in the Linux market. Unfortunately, this strategy was not successful and soon after Rob Kolstad had exited the company, it was facing bankruptcy.

In 2000 the company merged with Walnut Creek CDROM, a distributor of freeware and open source software on CD-ROM and shortly after that acquired Telenet System Solutions, Inc., an Internet infrastructure server supplier.

In 2001, under severe financial pressure from excessive leverage, BSDI (known as BSDi by that time) sold its software business unit (comprising BSD/OS and the former Walnut Creek FreeBSD and Slackware Linux open source offerings) to Wind River Systems and renamed the remainder iXsystems with a renewed focus on server hardware. Wind River dropped sponsorship of Slackware soon afterwards and the FreeBSD unit was divested as a separate entity FreeBSD Mall, Inc. in 2002. Faced with competition from open-source BSD- and Linux-based operating systems, Wind River discontinued BSD/OS in December 2003. Many of its technologies live on in community-led BSD derivatives like FreeBSD. In 2002, OffMyServer acquired the iXsystems hardware business and reverted to the iXsystems name in 2005.

== See also ==
- BSD
- FreeBSD
- Wind River Systems
- iXsystems
