= Jolitz =

Jolitz is a surname. Notable people with the surname include:

- Evan Jolitz (born 1951), American football linebacker
- Lynne Jolitz (born 1961), American computer scientist and start-up founder
- William Jolitz (1957–2022), American software programmer
