= BSD Daemon =

- The BSD Daemon as drawn by Poul-Henning Kamp
- Designed by: Phil Foglio; Mike O'Brien; John Lasseter

In-universe information
- Nickname: Beastie

The BSD Daemon, nicknamed Beastie, is the generic mascot of BSD operating systems. The BSD Daemon is named after software daemons, a class of long-running computer programs in Unix-like operating systems—which, through a play on words, takes the cartoon shape of a demon. The BSD Daemon's nickname Beastie is a slurred phonetic (in American English) pronunciation of BSD. Beastie customarily carries a trident to symbolize a software daemon's forking of processes. The FreeBSD web site has noted Evi Nemeth's 1988 remarks about cultural-historical daemons in the Unix System Administration Handbook: "The ancient Greeks' concept of a 'personal daemon' was similar to the modern concept of a 'guardian angel' ... As a rule, UNIX systems seem to be infested with both daemons and demons."

== Copyright ==
The copyright on the official BSD Daemon images is owned by Marshall Kirk McKusick, a very early BSD developer who worked with Bill Joy. McKusick has freely licensed the mascot for individual "personal use within the bounds of good taste (an example of bad taste was a picture of the BSD Daemon blowtorching a Solaris logo)." Any use requires both a copyright notice and attribution.

Reproduction of the daemon in quantity, such as on T-shirts and CDROMs, requires advance permission from McKusick, who restricts its use to implementations having to do with BSD and not as a company logo, although companies with BSD-based products such as Scotgold and Wind River Systems have obtained this kind of permission.

McKusick said that, during the early 1990s, "I almost lost the daemon to a certain large company because I failed to show due diligence in protecting it. So, I've taken due diligence seriously since then."

McKusick explained:

I prefer that the BSD Daemon be used in the context of BSD software. That is the reason that I carefully control my copyright of the BSD Daemon image to ensure that the image is not used inappropriately. I have agreed to allow the small image to appear on Wikipedia but not the larger ones. It is also why I am not going to put a Creative Commons copyright on it.

== History ==
The BSD Daemon was first drawn in 1976 by comic artist Phil Foglio. Developer Mike O'Brien, who was working as a bonded locksmith at the time, opened a wall safe in Foglio's Chicago apartment after a roommate had "split town" without leaving the combination. In return Foglio agreed to draw T-shirt artwork for O'Brien, who gave him some Polaroid snaps of a PDP-11 system running UNIX along with some notions about visual puns having to do with pipes, demons/daemons, forks, a "bit bucket" named /dev/null, etc. Foglio's drawing showed four happy little red daemon characters carrying tridents and climbing about on (or falling off of) water pipes in front of a caricature of a PDP-11 and was used for the first national UNIX meeting in the US (which was held in Urbana, Illinois). Bell Labs bought dozens of T-shirts featuring this drawing, which subsequently appeared on UNIX T-shirts for about a decade. Usenix purchased the reproduction rights to Foglio's artwork in 1986. His original drawing was then apparently lost, shortly after having been sent to Digital Equipment Corporation for use in an advertisement; all known copies are from photographs of surviving T-shirts.

The BSD Daemon as drawn by John Lasseter, whose take on the BSD mascot first showed up on a book cover in 1988. This image is from Walnut Creek CDROM for FreeBSD 2.0.

The later, more popular versions of the BSD Daemon were drawn by animation director John Lasseter beginning with an early greyscale drawing on the cover of the Unix System Manager's Manual published in 1984 by USENIX for 4.2BSD. Its author/editor Sam Leffler (who had been a technical staff member at CSRG) and Lasseter were both employees of Lucasfilm at the time. About four years after this Lasseter drew his widely known take on the BSD Daemon for the cover of McKusick's co-authored 1988 book, The Design and Implementation of the 4.3BSD Operating System. Lasseter drew a somewhat lesser-known running BSD Daemon for the 4.4BSD version of the book in 1994.

=== Use in operating system logos ===
From 1994 to 2004, the NetBSD project used artwork by Shawn Mueller as a logo, featuring four BSD Daemons in a pose similar to the famous photo, Raising the Flag on Iwo Jima. However, this logo was seen as inappropriate for an international project, and it was superseded by a more abstract flag logo, chosen from over 400 entries in a competition.

Early versions of OpenBSD (2.3 and 2.4) used a BSD Daemon with a halo, and briefly used a daemon police officer for version 2.5. Then, however, OpenBSD switched to Puffy, a blowfish, as a mascot.

The FreeBSD project used the 1988 Lasseter drawing as both a logo and mascot for 12 years. However, questions arose as to the graphic's effectiveness as a logo. The daemon was not unique to FreeBSD since it was historically used by other BSD variants and members of the FreeBSD core team considered it inappropriate for corporate and marketing purposes. Lithographically, the scanned Lasseter drawing is not line art and however drawn neither scaled easily in a wide range of sizes nor rendered appealingly in only two or three colours. A contest to create a new FreeBSD logo began in February 2005 and a scalable graphic which somewhat echoes the BSD Daemon's head was chosen the following October, although "the little red fellow" has been kept on as an official project mascot.

Walnut Creek CDROM also produced two variations of the daemon for its CDROM covers. The FreeBSD 1.0 and 1.1 CDROM covers used the 1988 Lasseter drawing. The FreeBSD 2.0 CDROM used a variant with different colored (specifically green) tennis shoes. Other distributions used this image with different colored tennis shoes over the years. Starting with FreeBSD 2.0.5, Walnut Creek CDROM covers used the daemon walking out of a CDROM. Starting with FreeBSD 4.5, the FreeBSD Mall used a mirrored image of the Walnut Creek 2.0 image. The Walnut Creek 2.0 image has also appeared on the cover of different FreeBSD Handbook editions.

==== Deprecated name ====
In the mid-1990s a marketer for Walnut Creek CDROM called the mascot Chuck, perhaps referring to a brand name for the kind of shoes worn by the character but this name is strongly deprecated by the copyright holder who has said the BSD Daemon "is very proud of the fact that he does not have a name, he is just the BSD Daemon. If you insist on a name, call him Beastie."

==== ASCII image ====
                ,        ,         
               /(        )`        
               \ \___   / |        
               /- _  `-/  '        
              (/\/ \ \   /\        
              / /   | `    \       
              O O   ) /    |       
              `-^--'`<     '       
             (_.)  _  )   /        
              `.___/`    /         
                `-----' /          
   <----.     __ / __   \          
   <----|====O)))==) \) /====|      
   <----'    `--' `.__,' \         
                |        |         
                 \       /       /\
            ______( (_  / \______/ 
          ,'  ,-----'   |          
          `--{__________)          

This ASCII art image of the BSD Daemon by Felix Lee appeared in the startup menu of FreeBSD version 5.x and can still be set as startup image in later versions. It is also used in the daemon_saver screensaver.

== See also ==
- List of computing mascots
- Category:Computing mascots
- Tux (mascot), the mascot of Linux kernel
- Konqi, the mascot of KDE
- Glenda, the Plan 9 Bunny, the mascot of Plan 9 from Bell Labs
- Puffy (mascot), the mascot of OpenBSD
- Mozilla (mascot), the mascot of Mozilla Foundation
- Kiki the Cyber Squirrel, the mascot of Krita
- Wilber (mascot), the mascot of GIMP
