= 386BSD =

Unix-like operating system

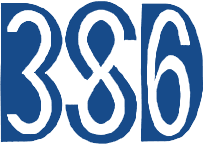

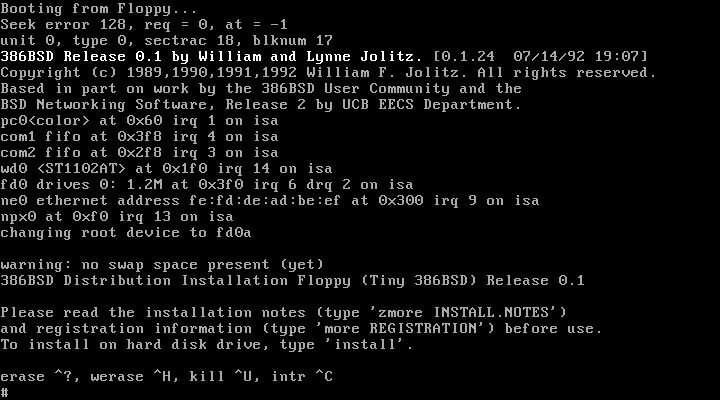
- 386BSD Release 0.1 installer ("Tiny 386BSD")
- Developer: William Jolitz; Lynne Jolitz
- OS family: UNIX
- Working state: Historical
- Source model: Open source
- Initial release: 0.0 March 12, 1992; 34 years ago
- Latest release: 2.0 / August 2016; 10 years ago
- Repository: github.com/386bsd/386bsd
- Supported platforms: x86
- License: BSD license until version o.1 Source-available software (according to upload to github) since version 1.0
- Succeeded by: FreeBSD, NetBSD
- Official website: 386bsd.org

386BSD (also known as "Jolix") is a Unix-like operating system that was developed by couple Lynne and William "Bill" Jolitz. Released in 1992, it was the first fully operational free and open-source Unix built to run on i386-based IBM PC-compatible computers, and it could run on affordable home hardware. Its innovations included role-based security, ring buffers, self-ordered configuration and modular kernel design.

Development began in 1989 while the Jolitzes were at the University of California, Berkeley's Computer Systems Research Group (CSRG), intended to be a port of BSD to 386-based personal computers. They then contributed the project to the university with some of the work ending up in BSD's Net/2, distributed in 1991. However, when the CSRG scrapped the project and ruled that his work was "university proprietary", Jolitz rewrote the code from scratch, based on the incomplete free code from Net/2. Jolitz also claims that 386BSD was the base of Berkeley Software Design (BSDi)'s commercial BSD/386.

386BSD was short-lived as disagreements between Jolitz and a group of users regarding its future direction led to the users forking it into the FreeBSD project as well as the separate NetBSD, both of which continue to this day; 386BSD's version 1.0 was released in 1994, after which work on it had ceased. Eventually, Linux would take off as the most popular complete free Unix clone for PCs, partly due to the slow progress of 386BSD and the then-ongoing lawsuit surrounding BSD.

== History and releases ==
386BSD was written mainly by Berkeley alumni Lynne Jolitz and William Jolitz. William had considerable experience with prior BSD releases while at the University of California, Berkeley (2.8 and 2.9BSD) and both contributed code developed at Symmetric Computer Systems during the 1980s, to Berkeley. William worked at Berkeley on porting 4.3BSD-Reno and later 4.3BSD Net/2 to the Intel 80386 for the university. 4.3BSD Net/2 was an incomplete non-operational release, with portions withheld by the University of California as encumbered (i.e. subject to an AT&T UNIX source code license). 386BSD does not contain any original Unix code.

The port began in 1989 and the first, incomplete traces of the port can be found in 4.3BSD Net/2 of 1991. The port was made possible as Keith Bostic, partly influenced by Richard Stallman, had started to remove proprietary AT&T out of BSD in 1988. The port was first released to the public in March 1992 (version 0.0) - based on portions of the 4.3BSD Net/2 release coupled with additional code (see "Missing Pieces I and II", Dr. Dobb's Journal, May–June 1992) - and in a much more usable version on July 14, 1992 (version 0.1).

386BSD proved popular, with it receiving 250,000 downloads from the FTP server it was hosted on. It was helped partly by the porting process with code being extensively documented in a 17-part series written by Lynne and William in Dr. Dobb's Journal beginning in January 1991.

In late 1994, a finished version 386BSD Release 1.0 was distributed by Dr. Dobb's Journal on CD-ROM only due to the immense size (600 MB) of the release (the "386BSD Reference CD-ROM") and was a best-selling CDROM for three years (1994–1997). 386BSD Release 1.0 contained a completely new kernel design and implementation, and began the process to incorporate recommendations made by earlier Berkeley designers that had never been attempted in BSD.

On August 5, 2016, two updates were pushed to the 386BSD GitHub repository by developer Ben Jolitz, named version 1.0 and version 2.0. Both versions contain a modified BSD 4 clause license with 4 additional clauses which prohibit commercial sale (Clause 6) and also prohibit distribution of modified versions in either source or binary forms (clause 7).

Version 2.0 According to the official website, Release 2.0 "built upon the modular framework to create self-healing components." However, as of March 16, 2017, almost all of the documentation remains the same as version 1.0, and a changelog was not available.

=== FreeBSD and NetBSD ===
After the release of 386BSD 0.1, a group of users began collecting bug fixes and enhancements, releasing them as an unofficial patchkit. Due to differences of opinion between the Jolitzes and the patchkit maintainers over the future direction and release schedule of 386BSD, the maintainers of the patchkit founded the FreeBSD project in 1993 to continue their work. Around the same time, the NetBSD project was founded by a different group of 386BSD users, with the aim of unifying 386BSD with other strands of BSD development into one multi-platform system. Both projects continue to this day.

The FreeBSD website at the time claimed that 386BSD suffered from "neglect". However, the 386BSD site claimed that this is not true:

This whole "FreeBSD roots" is completely fictitious, and invented to cover the wholesale theft of the 386BSD user base.

== Unix and BSD lawsuit ==
Due to a lawsuit (UNIX System Laboratories, Inc. v. Berkeley Software Design, Inc.), some potentially so-called encumbered source was agreed to have been distributed within the Berkeley Software Distribution Net/2 from the University of California, and a subsequent release (1993, 4.4BSD-Lite) was made by the university to correct this issue. However, 386BSD, Dr. Dobb's Journal, and the Jolitzes were never parties to these or subsequent lawsuits or settlements arising from this dispute with the University of California, and continued to publish and work on the 386BSD code base before, during, and after these lawsuits without limitation. There has never been any legal filings or claims from the university, USL, or other responsible parties with respect to 386BSD. Finally, no code developed for 386BSD done by William Jolitz and Lynne Jolitz was at issue in any of these lawsuits.

== Copyright and use of the code ==
All rights with respect to 386BSD and JOLIX are now held exclusively by William and Lynne Jolitz. 386BSD public releases ended in 1997 since code is now available from the many 386BSD-derived operating systems today, along with several derivatives thereof (such as FreeBSD, NetBSD and OpenBSD). Portions of 386BSD may be found in other open systems such as OpenSolaris.

== Relationship with BSD/386 ==
386BSD is often confused with BSD/386 which was a different project developed by BSDi, a Berkeley spinout, starting in 1991. BSD/386 used the same 386BSD code contributed to the University of California on 4.3BSD NET/2. Although Jolitz worked briefly for UUNET (which later spun out BSDi) in 1991, the work he did for them diverged from that contributed to the University of California and did not appear in 386BSD. Instead, William Jolitz gave regular code updates to Donn Seeley of BSDi for packaging and testing, and returned all materials when William left the company following fundamental disagreements on company direction and goals.
