= Michael A. Padlipsky =

American computer scientist

Michael Padlipsky
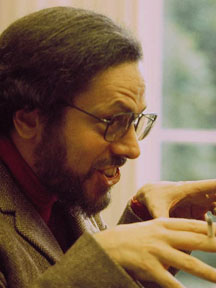
- Mike Padlipsky in the mid-1970s
- Born: May 9, 1939; New Jersey
- Died: March 3, 2011 (aged 71); Los Angeles, California
- Citizenship: United States of America
- Education: Massachusetts Institute of Technology
- Known for: TCP/IP, "constructive snottiness", anonymous FTP, Host-Front End Protocol, The Elements of Networking Style (and Other Essays & Animadversions of the Art of Intercomputer Networking)
- Scientific career
- Fields: Computer science, networking

Initials

Michael A. Padlipsky, (May 9, 1939 – March 3, 2011), known as MAP or Mike, was an early member of the working group that developed the ARPANET networking protocols that underpin today's Internet, and an internetworking polemicist.

His book The Elements of Networking Style (and Other Essays & Animadversions of the Art of Intercomputer Networking) has been described as "A really vicious critique of the misguided ISO networking standards attempt, written when the 'OSI model' was trendy & lots of people were babbling about the sacred seven layers."

== Professional life ==
=== Multics ===
Mike worked as part of the Multics development team at the Massachusetts Institute of Technology (M.I.T.) Project MAC, latterly leading the network group there. He wrote 10 papers, 1 Multics Technical Bulletin, 82 Multics System Programmer's Manual sections. When internetworking of dissimilar computer types was begun under ARPA funding, Mike participated representing Multics.

=== Internetworking ===
Full participation in ARPANET technical discussions required current programming assignments on ARPANET. Mike summarized his own internetworking experience as follows:

Therefore, to combat that sort of brain surgery by transmission mechanics, I feel I should present my credentials. ... So, aside from having coined the term "Old Network Boy"—and being one—and indeed probably being the only person in the world who knew, worked with, and was even on friendly terms with Vint Cerf, Jon Postel, and Dave Clark before they got their respective doctorates, I was an active participant in the design of the ARPANET "Old" and "New" Telnet protocols, the File Transfer Protocol, and the first Graphics Protocol; I was the originator and a principal designer of "neted," a common editor command for the ARPANET; and I was the originator and a principal designer of the first Host-Front-End Protocol, not only for the ARPANET. I also implemented "Old" Telnet for Multics, did the integration and checkout of NCP and Telnet on 645 Multics—setting the one-month record for Development Machine Time in the process—and later served as the Multics Network Technical Liaison and Network and Graphics Group Leader, supervising the attachment of 6180 Multics to the ARPANET in the process. In recent years, I've tried to help the Government get some of its money's worth from contractors on any number of networks too depressing to mention both for the —————* [Name withheld to avoid the necessity of Corporate Review] (Note: Ed. But spelled "MITRE.") Corporation, which now [Ed. 1983] employs me, and for the DoD's Protocol Standards Technical Panel.

While a member of the Network Working Group (NWG), Mike wrote 23 RFCs.

Of these, RFCs 871-875 (Perspective on the ARPANET Reference Model, TCP-on-a-LAN, Illusion of Vendor Support, Critique of X.25, and Gateways, Architectures, and Heffalumps), together with his description of the milieu of early ARPANET internetworking discussions, And They Argued All Night..., (Note: which originally appeared in Matrix News and was subsequently reprinted in The ARPANET Sourcebook, pp. 504-509.) were the most influential and formed the core of The Book.

=== "The Book" ===
In 1985, Mike combined several of his existing RFCs concerning the ARPANET Reference Model with newly written contextual sections and several papers (including And They Argued All Night...) into a book—The Elements of Networking Style (and Other Essays & Animadversions of the Art of Intercomputer Networking). This book compared and contrasted the ARPANET Reference Model (ARM) (not hitherto documented explicitly) and the ISO/OSI Reference Model (which Mike called the ISORM, suggesting the pronunciation "eyesore-mmm"). The book was serious in intent, but was written with his characteristic "constructive snottiness". The book questioned the wisdom of moving to the ISORM suite of protocols ("... oversold, underdesigned, & years from here"). In John S. Quarterman's book The Matrix: Computer Networks and Conferencing Systems Worldwide, The Book is the sole reference for the "Internet Reference Model."

On the occasion of The Book's reissuance, Peter Salus wrote a review in Cisco's Internet Protocol Journal which included the following observations:

Padlipsky brought together several strands that managed to result in the perfect chord for me over 15 years ago. I reread this slim volume (made up of a Foreword, 11 chapters (each a separate arrow from Padlipsky's quiver) and three appendixes (made up of half a dozen darts of various lengths and a sheaf of cartoons and slogans) several months ago, and have concluded that it is as acerbic and as important now as it was 15 years ago. [Emphasis added] The instruments Padlipsky employs are a sharp wit (and a deep admiration for François Marie Arouet), a sincere detestation for the ISO Reference Model, a deep knowledge of the Advanced Research Projects Agency Network (ARPANET)/Internet, and wide reading in classic science fiction.

In a lighter tone, the book has been described as “beyond doubt the funniest technical book ever written.”

== Education ==
Mike attended M.I.T. where he received a double major in applied mathematics and English. His senior thesis, More Than Pulp(?): Science Fiction and the Problem of Literary Value , (Note: His thesis is referenced in Science fiction western) grew from his love for classic science fiction and focused on Sturgeon's implicit 10%: the quality of the science fiction that wasn't crud/crap (see Sturgeon's law).

== Real Area of Research Interest ==
Mike was a connoisseur of malt whisky, or single malt Scotch in the United States. Beyond enjoying the odd dram, he also systematically recorded his tasting notes. Those notes were distributed informally for years before he assembled them for wider distribution. They can be found in a number of places on the Internet, notably The Edinburgh Malt Whisky Tour. He also was a regular contributor to the MaltManiacs Malts list.

At the intersection of Mike's involvement with internetting computers and his "real area of research" was what some have termed the Pun of the Year, 1986:

I was asked to give a talk at Edinburgh University, since I was going to be in the neighborhood to do field work in my real area of research interest, what we call single malt Scotch and what they call malt whisky. Having mentioned why I was around at the start of the talk, I was delighted to be invited to take a dram afterwards by a rather senior looking gent, up in his office, which turned out to be quite a posh one, making me assume he was quite senior. Since he had an appointment in a few minutes and I was supposed to go off to the pub with my local cohorts, we didn't even take time to sit, just exchanged a few pleasantries about our respective books and a thought or two about the particular malt whisky he'd happened to have in his desk. At the pub, I mentioned the incident to the gang and was informed that my host had been their new Professor of Computer Science, which, I might not know, was a relatively more distinguished rank there than in the States. I replied that I had [Ed. not?] known that, but was pleased with the information anyway since it would make the event all the more memorable. Then I added that I had just realized I'd have had to remember it forever anyway, since it was, after all, the first talk I'd ever given that had received a standing libation.
