= Keith Bostic =

Keith Bostic may refer to:

- Keith Bostic (American football) (born 1961), American football player
- Keith Bostic (software engineer) (born 1959), American software engineer
