= BSD/OS =

Unix-like operating system

- Developer: Berkeley Software Design, Inc. (1991–2001); Wind River Systems (2001–2003)
- Written in: C
- OS family: Net/2
- Working state: Discontinued
- Source model: Source-available
- Initial release: BSD/386 1.0, March 1993; 33 years ago
- Latest release: BSD/OS 5.1 / 2003; 23 years ago
- Marketing target: Internet server applications
- Available in: English
- Supported platforms: x86, SPARC, PowerPC
- Kernel type: Monolithic
- Default user interface: Command-line interface
- License: Proprietary

BSD/OS is a proprietary Unix operating system first released in 1993 as BSD/386. It was originally developed and sold by Berkeley Software Design, Inc. (BSDi) and designed to be a Unix for 386-based PCs. It was built off the Net/2 distribution of BSD, to which the developers had previously contributed.

Eventually the operating system was also ported to support PowerPC and SPARC architectures, and consequently was retitled to BSD/OS as of version 2.0 (1995). In 2001, BSDi sold the rights of the OS to Wind River Systems who developed and released version 5.0 in 2003 before discontinuing the product.

== History ==
BSDi was formed in 1991 by members of the Computer Systems Research Group (CSRG) at UC Berkeley to develop and sell a proprietary version of BSD Unix for PC compatible systems with Intel 386 (or later) processors. This made use of work previously done by Bill Jolitz to port BSD to the PC platform. BSDi had distributed over 300 copies of the beta version of BSD/386 by August 1992.

BSD/386 1.0 was released in March 1993. The company sold licenses and support for it, taking advantage of terms in the BSD License which permit use of the BSD software in proprietary systems, as long as the author is credited. The company in turn contributed code and resources to the development of non-proprietary BSD operating systems. In the meantime, Jolitz had left BSDi and independently released a free software BSD for PCs, called 386BSD. The BSDi system features complete and thorough manpage documentation for the entire system, including complete syntax and argument explanations, examples, file usage, authors, and cross-references to other commands.

BSD/386 licenses (including source code) were priced at $995, lower than AT&T UNIX System V source licenses, a fact highlighted in their advertisements. As part of the settlement of USL v. BSDi, BSDI substituted code that had been written for the university's 4.4 BSD-Lite release for disputed code in their OS, effective with release 2.0. By the time of this release, the "386" designation had become dated, and BSD/386 was renamed "BSD/OS". Later releases of BSD/OS also support Sun SPARC-based systems. BSD/OS 5.x versions are available for PowerPC too.

The marketing of BSD/OS became increasingly focused on Internet server applications. However, the increasingly tight market for Unix-compatible software in the late 1990s and early 2000s hurt sales of BSD/OS. On one end of the market, it lacked the certification of the Open Group to bear the UNIX trademark, and the sales force and hardware support of the larger Unix vendors. Simultaneously, it lacked the negligible acquisition cost of the open source BSDs and Linux. BSD/OS was acquired by Wind River Systems in April 2001. Wind River discontinued sales of BSD/OS at the end of 2003, with support terminated at the end of 2004.

== Releases ==
Version	Release date
BSD/386 (BSDi) 0.3.1	1992, April
BSD/386 (BSDi) 0.3.2	1992, June
BSD/386 (BSDi) 1.0	1993, March
BSD/386 (BSDi) 1.1	1994, February
BSD/OS (BSDi) 2.0	1995, January
BSD/OS (BSDi) 2.0.1	1995, June
BSD/OS (BSDi) 2.1	1996, January
BSD/OS (BSDi) 3.0	1997, February
BSD/OS (BSDi) 3.1	1998, March
BSD/OS (BSDi) 4.0	1998, August
BSD/OS (BSDi) 4.0.1	1999, March
BSD/OS (BSDi) 4.1	1999, December
BSD/OS (BSDi) 4.2	2000, November
BSD/OS (Wind River) 4.3	2002, March
BSD/OS (Wind River) 5.0	2003, May
BSD/OS (Wind River) 5.1	2003, October
