= Simtel =

Software archive

- Company type: company
- Website type: hosting service
- Founded: 1979
- Dissolved: 2013
- Founder: Keith Petersen
- Industry: Internet
- Website: simtel.net at the Wayback Machine (archived 2003-02-17)

Simtel (sometimes called Simtelnet, originally SIMTEL20) was an important long-running archive of freeware and shareware for various operating systems.

The Simtel archive had significant ties to the history of several operating systems: it was in turn a major repository for CP/M, MS-DOS, Microsoft Windows and FreeBSD. The archive was hosted initially on the MIT-MC PDP-10 running the Incompatible Timesharing System, then TOPS-20, then FreeBSD servers, with archive distributor Walnut Creek CDROM helping fund FreeBSD development. It began as an early mailing list, then was hosted on the ARPANET, and finally the fully open Internet.

The service was shut down on March 15, 2013.

== History ==
Simtel originated as SIMTEL20, a software archive started by Keith Petersen in 1979 while living in Royal Oak, Michigan. The original archive consisted of CP/M software for early 8080-based microcomputers. The software was hosted on a PDP-10 at MIT that also ran a CP/M mailing list to which Petersen subscribed.

When access to the particular MIT computer was removed in 1983, fellow CP/M enthusiast Frank Wancho, then an employee at the White Sands Missile Range, arranged for the archive to be hosted on a DECSYSTEM-20 computer with ARPANET access, accessible via FTP at simtel20.arpa, later known as wsmr-simtel20.army.mil, and wuarchive.wustl.edu At this time, Simtel began archiving MS-DOS software in addition to its archive of CP/M software. Over time, the SIMTEL20 archive added software for other operating systems, user groups and various programming languages, including the Ada Software Repository, the CP/M User's Group, PC/Blue, SIG/M(icros), and the Unix/C collections. In 1991, Walnut Creek CDROM was founded by Robert A. Bruce, which helped distribute the Simtel archive on CD-ROM discs for those not wishing, or unable, to access the archive online.

In 1993, the SIMTEL20 archive at White Sands Missile Range was shut down due to budget constraints. From 1993 on, the Walnut Creek CDROM FTP server and (later on) Web site became the focal point for online Simtel access. For much of its life the Web site and primary mirrors were located at www.cdrom.com, www.simtel.net, and oak.oakland.edu at Oakland University.

In July 1998, the Simtel FTP server set a record for overall traffic with a total transfer amount of 417 GB of data in one day. In May 1999, the Simtel FTP server surpassed its own record by transferring, in one day, a total of 873 GB. In the same year it served 10,000 clients at a time, showing that the C10k problem was tractable on contemporary systems.

Due to a mirror licensing dispute situation with Coast to Coast Telecommunications in 1995 (now Allegiance Telecom, part of XO Communications), archive maintainer Keith Petersen left his employment with CCT and moved on to Walnut Creek CDROM.

In October 1999, Digital River purchased Simtel from Walnut Creek CDROM for US$1.0 million and 143,885 shares of common stock. Mr. Petersen contracted with Digital River, along with small business owner and son Kurt Petersen of Petersen Business Management, to manage the Simtel collections and continued to do so until January 15, 2001. The service was shut down on March 15, 2013. Some mirrors may still be available.
