= Walnut Creek CDROM =

American software publishing company

Walnut Creek CDROM Inc.
- Industry: Software publishing
- Founded: August 1991; 35 years ago in Walnut Creek, California
- Founder: Bob Bruce
- Defunct: 2001; 25 years ago
- Fate: Restructured and renamed iXsystems
- Website: cdrom.com at the Wayback Machine (archived 1999-04-21)

Walnut Creek CDROM Inc. was an American software publishing company from 1991 to 2001. Founded by Bob Bruce in Walnut Creek, California, it was an early commercial provider of freeware, shareware, and free software on CD-ROMs. It ran the busiest FTP server on the Internet, ftp.cdrom.com.

== History ==
In the early years, some of the most popular products were Simtel shareware for MS-DOS, CICA Shareware for Microsoft Windows, and the Aminet archives for the Amiga. In January 1994, it published a collection of 350 texts from Project Gutenberg, one of the first published ebook collections.

Walnut Creek developed a close relationship with the FreeBSD project from its inception in 1993. The company published FreeBSD on CD-ROM, distributed it by FTP, employed FreeBSD project founders Jordan Hubbard and David Greenman, ran FreeBSD on its servers, sponsored FreeBSD conferences, and published FreeBSD books, including The Complete FreeBSD. By 1997, FreeBSD was Walnut Creek's "most successful product", according to Bruce. From 1995 onwards, Walnut Creek was also the official publisher of Slackware Linux. Walnut Creek also gained fame for its idgames subdirectory, which was the de facto distribution center for the Doom-engine modification community at the time.

As more users gained access to high-speed Internet connections, demand for software on physical media decreased dramatically. The company merged with Berkeley Software Design Inc. (BSDI) in 2000 to focus more engineering effort on the similar FreeBSD and BSD/OS operating systems. Soon after, BSDI acquired Telenet System Solutions, Inc., an Internet infrastructure server supplier.

The software assets of BSDI (FreeBSD, Slackware, BSD/OS) were acquired by Wind River Systems in 2001, and the remainder of the company renamed itself iXsystems. Wind River dropped sponsorship of Slackware soon afterwards, while the FreeBSD unit was divested as a separate entity in 2002 as FreeBSD Mall, Inc. Also, the idgames and related archives moved to 3D Gamers in October 2001.

iXsystems' server business was acquired in 2002 by Offmyserver, which reverted to the iXsystems name in 2005. In February 2007, iXsystems acquired FreeBSD Mall.

Walnut Creek CDROM's URL for a time was redirected to Simtel.net but is now "Page not found", as is SimTel (was shut down on March 15, 2013). In August 2025, the Singaporean domain aftermarket company Gname drop catched the domain. It became a URL redirect to a YouTube video.
