= Dru Lavigne =

Canadian software engineer

- Occupations: System administrator, instructor, managing editor, director
- Known for: BSD Certification, Open Source Business Resource

Dru Lavigne is a network and systems administrator, IT instructor, technical writer and director at FreeBSD Foundation.

She has been using FreeBSD since 1996, has authored several BSD books, and spent over 10 years developing training materials and providing training on the administration of FreeBSD systems.

She has written for O'Reilly, TechRepublic, DNSStuff, and OpenLogic, contributed to Linux Hacks and Hacking Linux Exposed, and is author of BSD Hacks and The Best of FreeBSD Basics. Her third and latest book, The Definitive Guide to PC-BSD, was released in March 2010. She has over a decade of experience administering and teaching Netware, Microsoft, Cisco, Checkpoint, SCO, Solaris, Linux and BSD systems. She is founder and current Chair of the BSD Certification Group Inc., a non-profit organization with a mission to create the standard for certifying BSD system administrators. She is also Community Manager for both the PC-BSD and FreeNAS projects, making her responsible for dealing with issues relating to community relations and the administration of various Forums. She is also the principal author / executive editor of most of the documentation for both projects.

Since 22 January 2013 she is a committer in the category "doc" at the FreeBSD Project.
