= Özalp Babaoğlu =

Turkish/American computer scientist (born 1955)

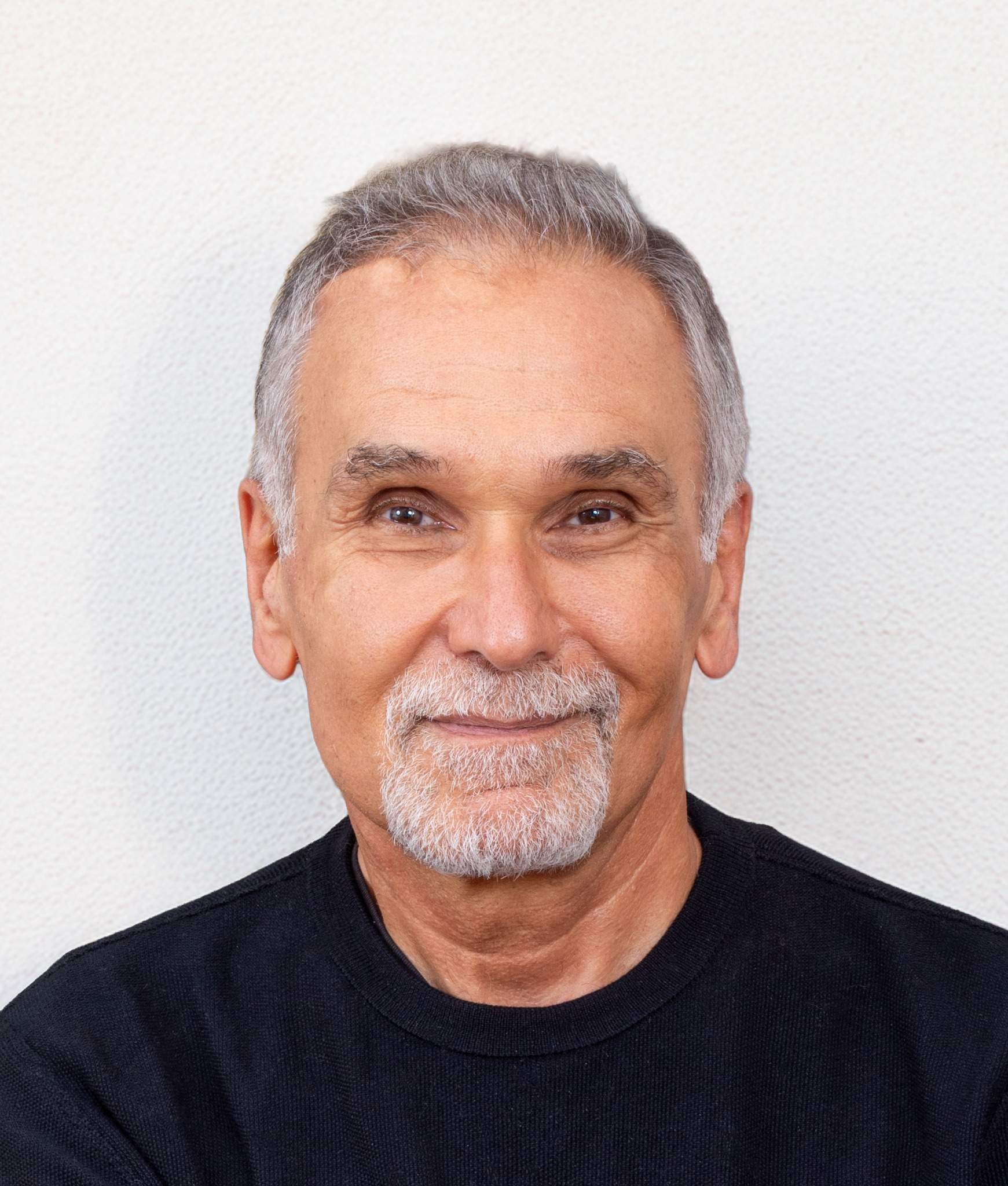
- Born: 10 August 1955 (age 71); Ankara, Turkey
- Education: George Washington University (BS); University of California at Berkeley (PHD)
- Known for: Contribution to BSD Unix and implementing virtual memory support; Fault-tolerant distributed computing; Biology and nature-inspired computing.
- Title: Professore Alma Mater, University of Bologna
- Children: 2
- Website: https://www.cs.unibo.it/~babaoglu/

Özalp Babaoğlu (born August 10, 1955) is a Turkish-American computer scientist specializing in operating systems, distributed computing, fault tolerance, self-organization, and the application of machine learning to high-performance computing systems. He holds the position of "Professore Alma Mater" at the University of Bologna, where he was a full professor of computer science from 1988 to 2025. He is also president of the ELICSIR Foundation, which he co-founded in 2024.

Babaoğlu is known for his work during his doctoral studies at the University of California, Berkeley, where he was one of the architects of the Berkeley Software Distribution (BSD) and, with Bill Joy, implemented the virtual memory system that allowed Unix to run on hardware lacking page-reference bits. He shared the 1993 USENIX Lifetime Achievement Award with the 180 individuals of Berkeley's Computer Systems Research Group who contributed to it.

He was elected a Fellow of the Association for Computing Machinery in 2002 for "contributions to fault-tolerant distributed computing, BSD Unix, and for leadership in the European distributed systems community". He has served on the editorial boards of ACM Transactions on Computer Systems, ACM Transactions on Autonomous and Adaptive Systems, and Springer-Verlag's Distributed Computing, and has been a resident fellow of the Institute of Advanced Studies at the University of Bologna.

== Early life and education ==
Babaoğlu was born in Ankara, Turkey, in 1955. He received a B.Sc. in electrical engineering from George Washington University in 1976, and M.Sc. and Ph.D. degrees in computer science from the University of California, Berkeley in 1977 and 1981, respectively. In the summer of 1978 he was an academic associate at the IBM San Jose Research Laboratory and during the first half of 1980 he was at the Numerical Analysis Institute of the Italian National Research Council in Pavia, Italy as a foreign scholar.

While doing his doctoral work the University of California, Berkeley, he worked on BSD Unix and along with Bill Joy, he was the co-implementor of the virtual memory extensions to the Unix operating system for the DEC VAX, which was released as 3.0BSD. For his contributions to the Berkeley Unix operating system, he was a co-recipient of the 1982 David J. Sakrison Memorial Award, the 1989 UNIX International Recognition Award and the 1993 USENIX Association Lifetime Achievement Award.

== Career ==
Babaoğlu joined Cornell University's Department of Computer Science as an Assistant Professor in 1981 and was later promoted to Associate Professor, working on distributed systems and fault tolerance. He joined the University of Bologna in 1988 as a full professor of Computer Science, a position he held until 2025, when he became "Professore Alma Mater".

In Italy he took part in a series of European research projects in distributed computing and complex systems, including BROADCAST, CABERNET, ADAPT, and DELIS, and coordinated the EU Framework Five BISON project on biology-inspired techniques for self-organization from 2002 to 2005.

In 2001, Babaoğlu co-founded the Bertinoro International Center for Informatics (BiCi), an association that has hosted more than 300 scientific workshops and schools, and continues to serve on its steering committee and scientific advisory board. In 2007 he co-founded the IEEE International Conference on Self-Adaptive and Self-Organizing Systems (SASO), and sat on its steering committee from 2007 to 2019. He was a member of the ACM Heidelberg Laureate Forum selection committee from 2013 to 2019. In 2024 he co-founded the ELICSIR Foundation, of which he is currently president.

== Research ==
Babaoğlu is the author of more than 100 peer-reviewed papers spanning operating systems, performance evaluation and modeling, distributed computing, Byzantine agreement, parallel computing on networks of workstations, group communication, peer-to-peer systems, autonomic computing, gossip-based algorithms, overlay networks, nature-inspired computing, game-theoretic methods, cloud computing, and high-performance computing. According to Google Scholar, his work has been cited more than 7,700 times, giving him an h-index of 44.

=== BSD Unix ===
During his doctoral work at UC Berkeley, Babaoğlu was one of the architects of BSD Unix, which contributed to the rapid growth of the Internet through its built-in TCP/IP stack and influenced numerous later operating systems, among them FreeBSD, NetBSD, OpenBSD, SunOS, macOS, and iOS. The virtual memory system he implemented with Bill Joy became a core part of the kernel of Unix/32V, the first 32-bit version of Unix, written for the DEC VAX minicomputer — hardware that lacked page-reference bits. The Berkeley version of Unix became a standard in education and research, attracting development support from DARPA, and was distributed widely in source form so that others could study and improve it; this practice is now recognized as one of the earliest examples of what became the open-source software movement.

=== Distributed systems and fault tolerance ===
Babaoğlu's work on fault-tolerant distributed computing includes network architectures for fast reliable broadcast in the presence of Byzantine faults, programming paradigms for partitionable asynchronous systems such as enriched view synchrony, and specifications and algorithms for group communication in partitionable systems. Earlier work with Domenico Ferrari addressed replacement decisions in two-level paging stores. With colleagues at Bologna he developed Paralex, a system for parallel computing on networks of workstations.

=== Peer-to-peer systems and self-organization ===
Babaoğlu has contributed to peer-to-peer computing through programming paradigms, algorithms, and frameworks, including the Anthill agent-based framework and the widely used open-source simulator PeerSim. He has also studied game-theoretic techniques for discouraging free-riding and cheating in peer-to-peer systems. A recurring theme in this work is the use of gossip-based communication to obtain global system properties from purely local interactions, as in gossip-based aggregation of network-wide values and the T-Man protocol for constructing and maintaining overlay network topologies. Related work applies gossiping to decentralized shape formation and other "self-*" properties.

=== Nature-inspired computing ===
As part of the EU-funded BISON project, Babaoğlu and colleagues assembled a library of "design patterns" for distributed computing drawn from biological and other natural processes, arguing that mechanisms such as stigmergy, chemotaxis, and swarm intelligence can be transferred to large-scale computing systems. An earlier example is Messor, a load-balancing scheme based on a swarm of autonomous agents.

=== Cloud computing and machine learning for systems ===
Babaoğlu has worked on decentralized approaches to cloud infrastructure, including a peer-to-peer cloud design in which resources are contributed by end users rather than a single provider. His more recent research applies machine learning to the operation of high-performance computing systems and data centers, covering failure prediction, fault classification, job dispatching, and power-consumption modeling, with the aim of "operator-less" data centers driven by predictive and proactive autonomics.This line of work includes a holistic analysis of log data from the IBM Blue Gene/Q system.

== Awards and honors ==
- 2002: ACM Fellow, for "contributions to fault-tolerant distributed computing, BSD Unix, and for leadership in the European distributed systems community"
- 1993: USENIX Association Lifetime Achievement Award, shared as a member of Berkeley's Computer Systems Research Group
- 1989: UNIX International Recognition Award
- 1982: David J. Sakrison Memorial Award, University of California, Berkeley, as a co-recipient, for his contribution to the Berkeley Unix operating system

== Projects ==
- ELICSIR Foundation — co-founded in 2024, with Babaoğlu as president.
- Bertinoro International Center for Informatics (BiCi) — a scientific meeting center co-founded in 2001.
- BISON — an EU Framework Five project on biology-inspired self-organization, which Babaoğlu coordinated from 2002 to 2005.
- Paralex — a system for parallel programming on networks of workstations.
- PeerSim — an open-source simulator for large-scale peer-to-peer and gossip-based systems.
- Anthill — a framework for building agent-based peer-to-peer systems.

== Selected publications ==
- Babaoğlu, Ö., and Joy, W. (1981). "Converting a swap-based system to do paging in an architecture lacking page-referenced bits." ACM SIGOPS Operating Systems Review, 15(5), 78–86. doi:10.1145/1067627.806595
- Babaoglu, Ö., and Ferrari, D. (1983). Two-level replacement decisions in paging stores. IEEE Transactions on Computers, 100(12), 1151-1159. doi:10.1109/TC.1983.1676176
- Babaoğlu, Ö., and Drummond, R. (1985). "Streets of Byzantium: Network architectures for fast reliable broadcasts." IEEE Transactions on Software Engineering, SE-11(6), 546–554. doi:10.1109/tse.1985.232247
- Babaoğlu, Ö., and Marzullo, K. (1993). "Consistent global states of distributed systems: Fundamental concepts and mechanisms." In S. Mullender (ed.), Distributed Systems (2nd ed.). Addison-Wesley.
- Babaoğlu, Ö., Davoli, R., and Montresor, A. (2001). "Group communication in partitionable systems: specification and algorithms." IEEE Transactions on Software Engineering, 27(4), 308–336. doi:10.1109/32.917522
- Babaoğlu, Ö., Meling, H., and Montresor, A. (2002). "Anthill: A framework for the development of agent-based peer-to-peer systems." Proceedings of the 22nd International Conference on Distributed Computing Systems, 15–22. doi:10.1109/icdcs.2002.1022238
- Jelasity, M., Montresor, A., and Babaoğlu, Ö. (2005). "Gossip-based aggregation in large dynamic networks." ACM Transactions on Computer Systems, 23(3), 219–252. doi:10.1145/1082469.1082470
- Babaoğlu, Ö., et al. (2006). "Design patterns from biology for distributed computing." ACM Transactions on Autonomous and Adaptive Systems, 1(1), 26–66. doi:10.1145/1152934.1152937
- Jelasity, M., Montresor, A., and Babaoğlu, Ö. (2009). "T-Man: Gossip-based fast overlay topology construction." Computer Networks, 53(13), 2321–2339. doi:10.1016/j.comnet.2009.03.013
- Sîrbu, A., and Babaoğlu, Ö. (2016). "Towards operator-less data centers through data-driven, predictive, proactive autonomics." Cluster Computing, 19(2), 865–878. doi:10.1007/s10586-016-0564-y
- Babaoglu, O. and Sîrbu, A. (2018). "Cognified Distributed Computing," 2018 IEEE 38th International Conference on Distributed Computing Systems (ICDCS), Vienna, Austria, 2018, 1180-1191, doi:10.1109/ICDCS.2018.00118
- Antici, F., Bartolini, A., Kiziltan, Z., Babaoglu, O. and Kodama, Y. (2024). "MCBound: An Online Framework to Characterize and Classify Memory/Compute-bound HPC Jobs," SC24: International Conference for High Performance Computing, Networking, Storage and Analysis, Atlanta, GA, USA, 2024, 1-15, doi:10.1109/SC41406.2024.00062

== Personal life ==
Babaoğlu has a son and a daughter, and is an avid cyclist.
