= Lynne Jolitz =

American computer scientist (born 1961)

Lynne Greer Jolitz
- Born: June 30, 1961 (age 65)
- Notable work: developing the 386BSD operating system
- Spouse: William Jolitz

Lynne Greer Jolitz (born June 30, 1961) is a figure in free software and founder of many startups in Silicon Valley. Together with her husband William Jolitz, she created 386BSD, the first open-source Unix-based operating system for personal computers to be distributed over the Internet.

== Career ==
Jolitz is an author and authority on operating systems and networking issues. She is an Internet news media commentator discussing events in the computer industry and wrote frequently for BYTE magazine.

She also holds patents in Internet technologies and semiconductor memory innovations, and writes technical papers and articles.

She is currently an adviser to CoolClip network, an Internet startup that uses the server-based video production engine that Jolitz originally designed and tested at the University of California, Berkeley.

Jolitz has appeared on the Oracle E-Business Network and was presented with their Geek of the Week award for her years of work in high-speed networking and operating systems design. She also has appeared on Dvorak's RealComputing discussing the impact of Internet broadband.

She received an alumni award from the Physics Department at University of California, Berkeley for her work in alumni outreach with the department. She also is active in women's entrepreneur and technology networking groups and mentoring girls in science and technology.

Jolitz lives in Los Gatos, California.
