= Berkeley Software Distribution =

Unix operating system

BSD
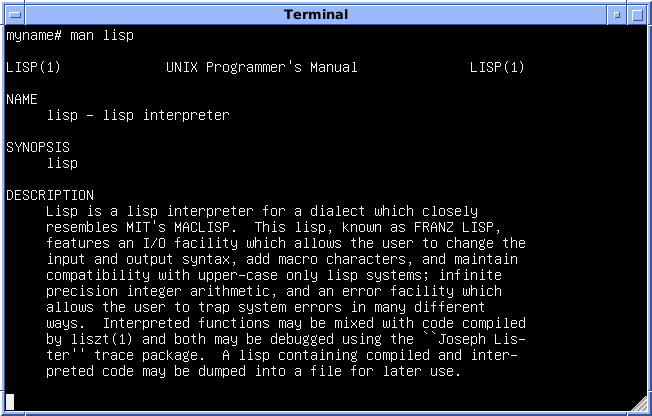
- 4.3 BSD UNIX (from the University of Wisconsin) man page of lisp.
- Developer: CSRG
- Written in: C
- OS family: Unix
- Working state: Discontinued
- Source model: Open-source
- Initial release: March 9, 1978; 48 years ago
- Final release: 4.4-Lite2 / June 1995; 31 years ago
- Available in: English
- Supported platforms: PDP-11; VAX; i386
- Kernel type: Monolithic
- Userland: BSD
- Influenced: 386BSD; BSD/386; NetBSD; FreeBSD; OpenBSD; DragonFly BSD; NeXTSTEP; Darwin
- Influenced by: Unix
- Default user interface: Unix shell
- License: BSD licenses

The Berkeley Software Distribution (Note: or Berkeley Standard Distribution) (BSD) or Berkeley UNIX is a discontinued Unix based operating system developed and distributed by the Computer Systems Research Group at the University of California, Berkeley. In contemporary usage, BSD is an umbrella term for derivatives such as FreeBSD, OpenBSD or NetBSD.

The first BSD release was in 1978. It began as an improved derivative of AT&T's original Unix developed at Bell Labs. Bill Joy and Ozalp Babaoglu led early development. The BSD project received funding from DARPA from 1979 to 1988. During this period, BSD incorporated ARPANET support and later implemented the TCP/IP protocol suite.

== History ==
The Research Unix from Bell Labs, released in the 1970s, included the source code to operating system, allowing university researchers to modify and extend Unix. The operating system arrived at the University of California, Berkeley, in 1974 at the request of computer science professor Bob Fabry, who had served on the program committee for the Symposium on Operating Systems Principles, where Unix was first presented. A PDP-11/45 was purchased to run Unix. However, for budgetary reasons, the machine was shared with Berkeley’s mathematics and statistics departments, which used RSTS/E. Consequently, Unix was available on the machine for only eight hours per day, either during the day or at night. The following year, Berkeley installed a larger PDP-11/70 using funds from the Ingres project.

=== Initial development of BSD ===
In 1975, Ken Thompson took a sabbatical from Bell Labs and became a visiting professor at the University of California, Berkeley. He helped install Version 6 Unix and began working on a Pascal implementation for the system. Graduate students Chuck Haley and Bill Joy improved Thompson’s Pascal implementation and developed an enhanced ex text editor. Other universities became interested in the software developed at Berkeley, and in 1977 Bill Joy began compiling the first Berkeley Software Distribution (1BSD), which was released on March 9, 1978. The first Berkeley Software Distribution was an extension of Version 6 Unix, not a complete operating system. Approximately 30 copies were distributed. The second Berkeley Software Distribution (2BSD) was released in May 1979 and included updates to the 1BSD software. It introduced two programs developed by Bill Joy: the C shell and the vi text editor, a visual version of ex. Approximately 75 copies of 2BSD were distributed by Bill Joy.

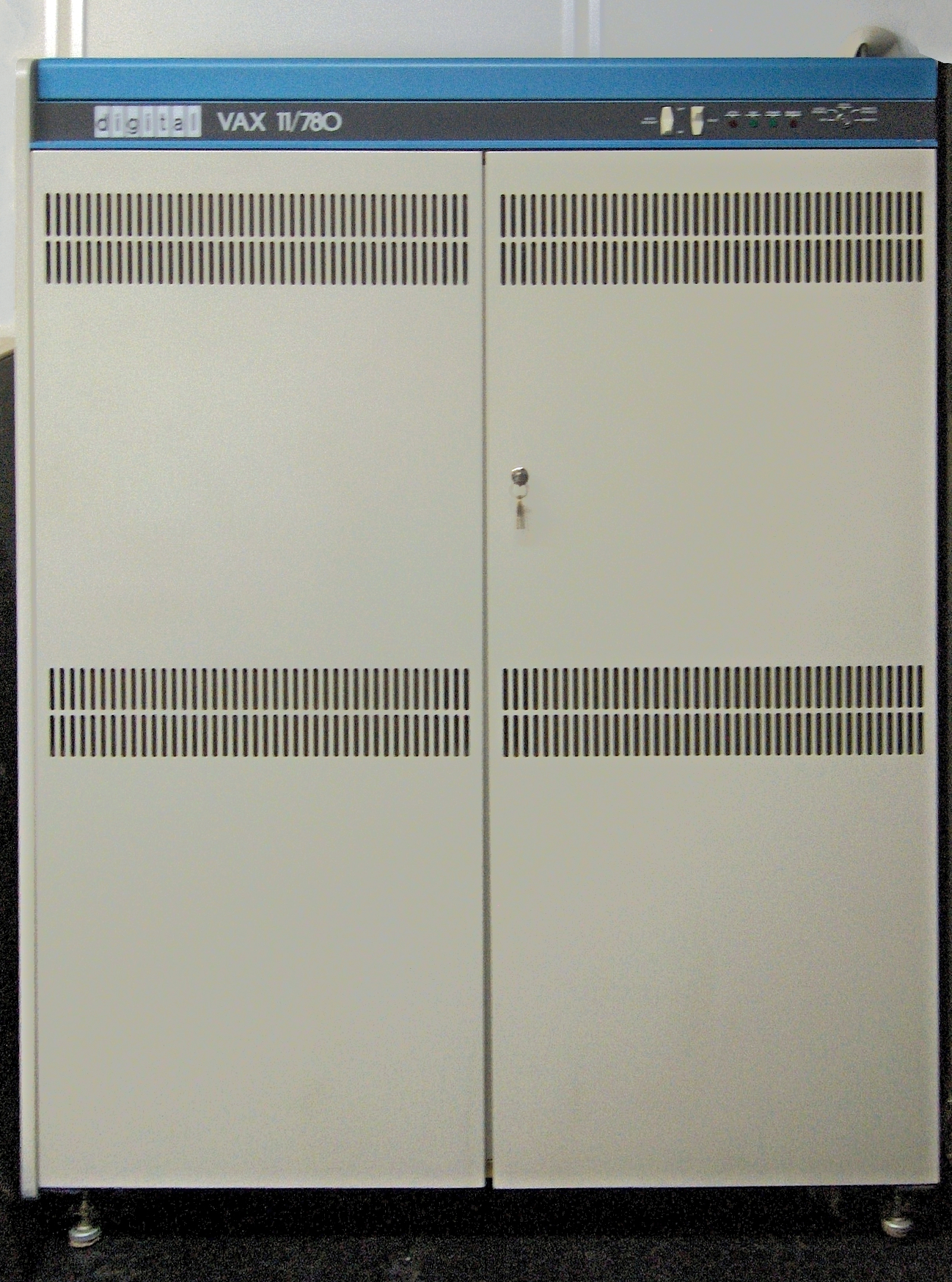
The VAX-11/780, a typical minicomputer used for early BSD timesharing systems

A VAX computer was installed at Berkeley in 1978, but the port of Unix to the VAX architecture, UNIX/32V, did not take advantage of the VAX's virtual memory capabilities. The kernel of 32V was largely rewritten to include Berkeley graduate student Özalp Babaoğlu's virtual memory implementation, and a complete operating system including the new kernel, ports of the 2BSD utilities to the VAX, and the utilities from 32V was released as 3BSD at the end of 1979. 3BSD was also alternatively called Virtual VAX/UNIX or VMUNIX (for Virtual Memory Unix), and BSD kernel images were normally called /vmunix until 4.4BSD.

3BSD was followed by 4BSD in November 1980, which offered a number of enhancements and became a popular choice for VAX installations. Further releases included 4.1BSD, which had various performance optimizations, and 4.2BSD, released in August 1983, which added TCP/IP networking and the Berkeley Fast File System.

After 4.3BSD (mainly comprising performance improvements) was released in June 1986, it was determined that BSD would move away from the aging VAX platform. The Power 6/32 platform (codenamed "Tahoe") developed by Computer Consoles Inc. seemed promising at the time, but was abandoned by its developers shortly thereafter. Nonetheless, the 4.3BSD-Tahoe port (June 1988) proved valuable, as it led to a separation of machine-dependent and machine-independent code in BSD which would improve the system's future portability.

In addition to portability, the CSRG worked on an implementation of the OSI network protocol stack, improvements to the kernel virtual memory system and (with Van Jacobson of LBL) new TCP/IP algorithms to accommodate the growth of the Internet.

Until then, all versions of BSD used proprietary AT&T Unix code, and were therefore subject to an AT&T software license. Source code licenses had become very expensive and several outside parties had expressed interest in a separate release of the networking code, which had been developed entirely outside AT&T and would not be subject to the licensing requirement. This led to Networking Release 1 (Net/1), which was made available to non-licensees of AT&T code and was freely redistributable under the terms of the BSD license. It was released in June 1989.

After Net/1, BSD developer Keith Bostic proposed that more non-AT&T sections of the BSD system be released under the same license as Net/1. To this end, he started a project to reimplement most of the standard Unix utilities without using the AT&T code. Within eighteen months, all of the AT&T utilities had been replaced, and it was determined that only a few AT&T files remained in the kernel. These files were removed, and the result was the June 1991 release of Networking Release 2 (Net/2), a nearly complete operating system that was freely distributable.

Net/2 was the basis for two separate ports of BSD to the Intel 80386 architecture: the free 386BSD by William and Lynne Jolitz, and the proprietary BSD/386 (later renamed BSD/OS) by Berkeley Software Design (BSDi). 386BSD itself was short-lived, but became the initial code base of the NetBSD and FreeBSD projects that were started shortly thereafter.

BSDi soon found itself in legal trouble with AT&T's Unix System Laboratories (USL) subsidiary, then the owners of the System V copyright and the Unix trademark. The USL v. BSDi lawsuit was filed in 1992 and led to an injunction on the distribution of Net/2 until the validity of USL's copyright claims on the source could be determined. The lawsuit slowed development of the free-software descendants of BSD for nearly two years while their legal status was in question, and as a result systems based on the Linux kernel, which did not have such legal ambiguity, gained greater support. The lawsuit was settled in January 1994, largely in Berkeley's favor. Of the 18,000 files in the Berkeley distribution, only three had to be removed and 70 modified to show USL copyright notices. A further condition of the settlement was that USL would not file further lawsuits against users and distributors of the Berkeley-owned code in the upcoming 4.4BSD release.

The final release from Berkeley was 1995's 4.4BSD-Lite Release 2, after which the CSRG was dissolved and development of BSD at Berkeley ceased. Since then, several variants based directly or indirectly on 4.4BSD-Lite (such as FreeBSD, NetBSD, OpenBSD and DragonFly BSD) have been maintained.

The permissive nature of the BSD license has allowed many other operating systems, both open-source and proprietary, to incorporate BSD source code. For example, Windows NT 3.1 used BSD code in its implementation of TCP/IP and bundles recompiled versions of BSD's command-line networking tools since Windows 2000. Darwin, the basis for Apple's macOS and iOS, is based on 4.4BSD-Lite2 and FreeBSD. Various commercial Unix operating systems, such as Solaris, also incorporate BSD code.

=== Relationship to Research Unix ===
Starting with the 8th Edition, versions of Research Unix at Bell Labs had a close relationship to BSD. This began when 4.1cBSD for the VAX was used as the basis for Research Unix 8th Edition. This continued in subsequent versions, such as the 9th Edition, which incorporated source code and improvements from 4.3BSD. The result was that these later versions of Research Unix were closer to BSD than they were to System V. In a Usenet posting from 2000, Dennis Ritchie described this relationship between BSD and Research Unix:

Research Unix 8th Edition started from (I think) BSD 4.1c, but with enormous amounts scooped out and replaced by our own stuff. This continued with 9th and 10th. The ordinary user command-set was, I guess, a bit more BSD-flavored than SysVish, but it was pretty eclectic.

=== Relationship to System V ===
Eric S. Raymond summarizes the longstanding relationship between System V and BSD, stating, "The divide was roughly between longhairs and shorthairs; programmers and technical people tended to line up with Berkeley and BSD, more business-oriented types with AT&T and System V."

In 1989, David A. Curry wrote about the differences between BSD and System V. He characterized System V as being often regarded as the "standard Unix." However, he described BSD as more popular among university and government computer centers, due to its advanced features and performance:

Most university and government computer centers that use UNIX use Berkeley UNIX, rather than System V. There are several reasons for this, but perhaps the two most significant are that Berkeley UNIX provides networking capabilities that until recently (Release 3.0) were completely unavailable in System V, and that Berkeley UNIX is much more suited to a research environment, which requires a faster file system, better virtual memory handling, and a larger variety of programming languages.

== Technology ==
=== Berkeley sockets ===
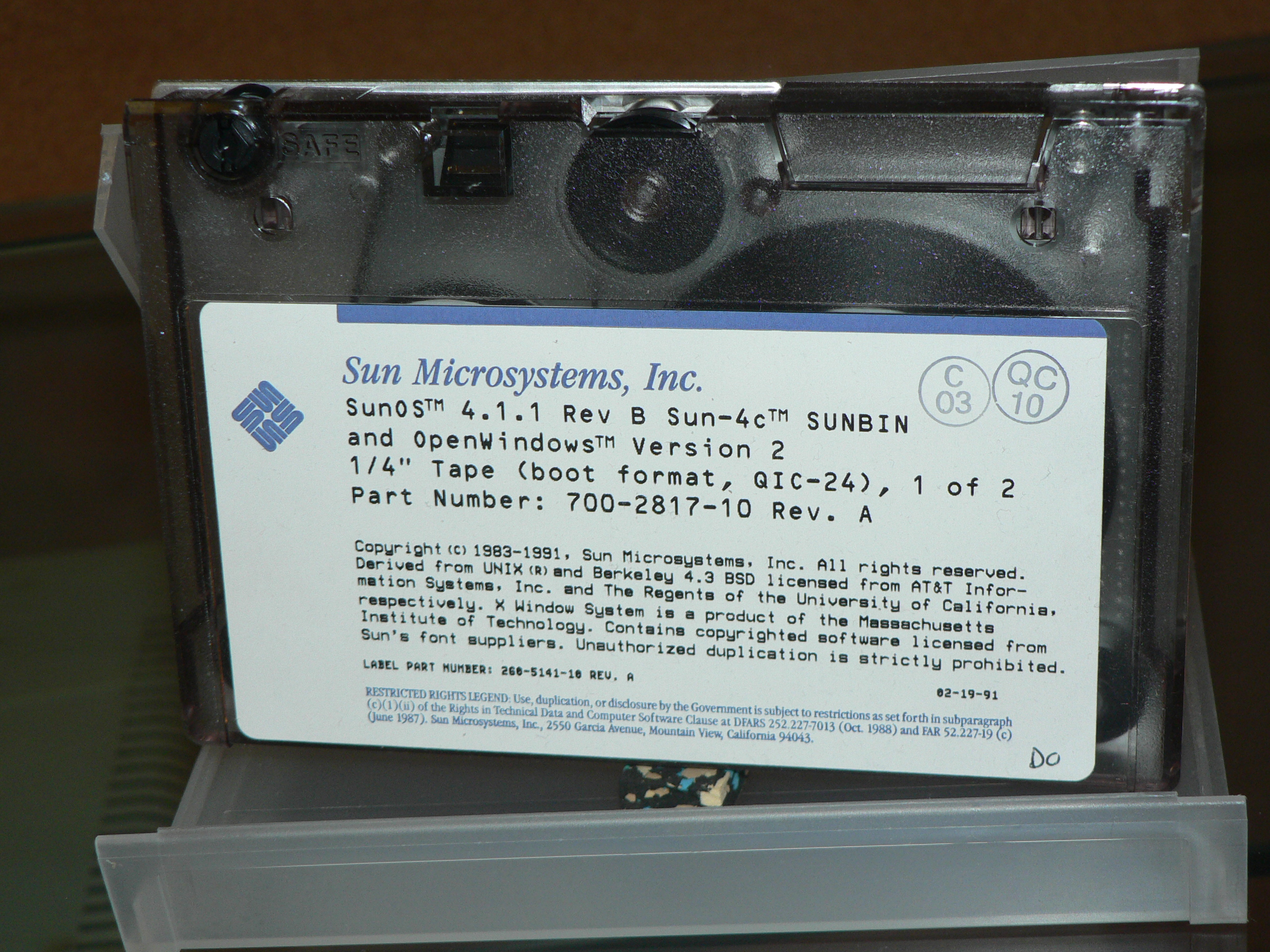
Tape for SunOS 4.1.1, a 4.3BSD derivative

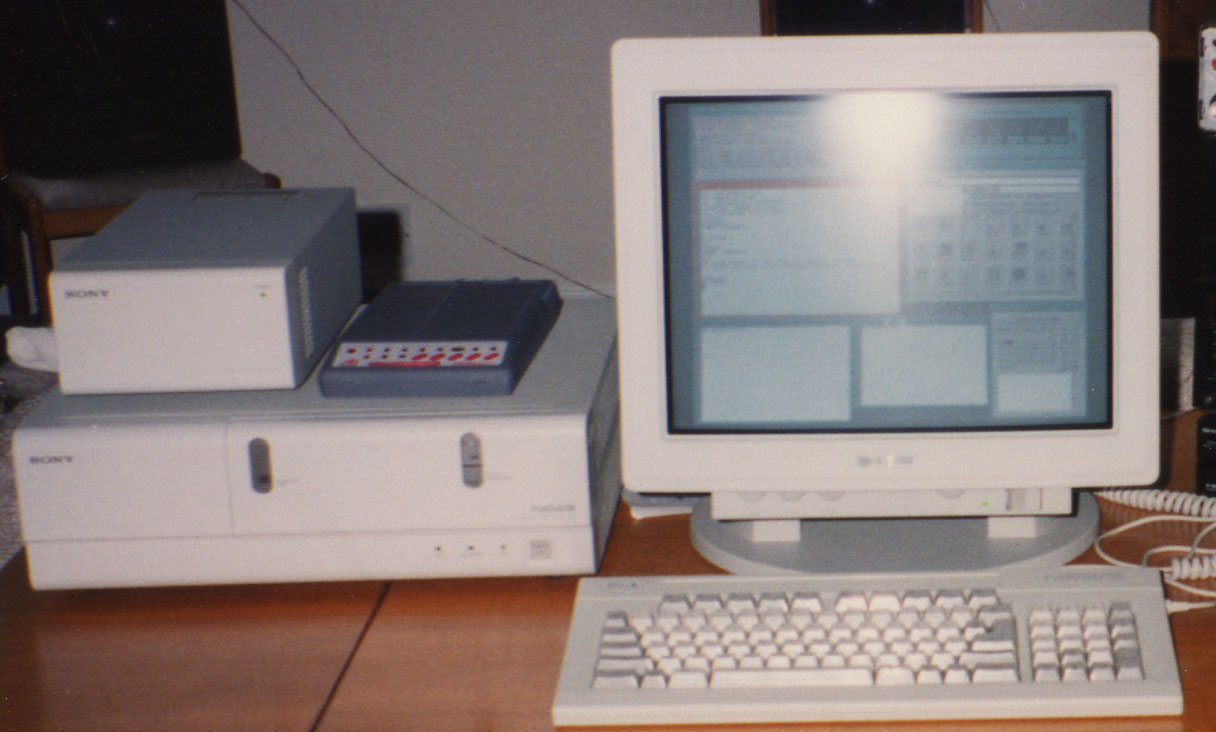
Sony NEWS workstation running the BSD-based NEWS-OS operating system

Berkeley's Unix was the first Unix to include libraries supporting the Internet Protocol stacks: Berkeley sockets. A Unix implementation of IP's predecessor, the ARPAnet's NCP, with FTP and Telnet clients, had been produced at the University of Illinois in 1975, and was available at Berkeley. However, the memory scarcity on the PDP-11 forced a complicated design and performance problems.

By integrating sockets with the Unix operating system's file descriptors, it became almost as easy to read and write data across a network as it was to access a disk. The AT&T laboratory eventually released their own STREAMS library, which incorporated much of the same functionality in a software stack with a different architecture, but the wide distribution of the existing sockets library reduced the impact of the new API. Early versions of BSD were used to form Sun Microsystems' SunOS, founding the first wave of popular Unix workstations.

=== Binary compatibility ===
Some BSD operating systems can run native software of several other operating systems on the same architecture, using a binary compatibility layer. This is much simpler and faster than emulation; for example, it allows applications intended for Linux to be run at effectively full speed. This makes BSDs not only suitable for server environments, but also for workstation ones, given the increasing availability of commercial or closed-source software for Linux only. This also allows administrators to migrate legacy commercial applications, which may have only supported commercial Unix variants, to a more modern operating system, retaining the functionality of such applications until they can be replaced by a better alternative.

=== Standards ===
Current BSD operating system variants support many of the common IEEE, ANSI, ISO, and POSIX standards, while retaining most of the traditional BSD behavior. Like AT&T Unix, the BSD kernel is monolithic, meaning that device drivers in the kernel run in privileged mode, as part of the core of the operating system.

== BSD systems ==
Simplified evolution of Unix systems. Not shown are Junos, PlayStation 3 system software and other proprietary forks.

FreeBSD, NetBSD, OpenBSD, and DragonFly BSD are operating systems based on the Berkeley Software Distribution. FreeBSD and NetBSD were both established in 1993, initially deriving from 386BSD before merging the 4.4BSD-Lite source code in 1994. Shortly thereafter, in 1995, OpenBSD was created as a fork of NetBSD; in 2003, DragonFly BSD was created as a fork of FreeBSD. BSD was also used as the basis for several proprietary versions of Unix, such as SunOS, DYNIX, NeXTSTEP, Ultrix and Tru64 UNIX.

=== macOS ===
Apple’s operating systems trace its origins to NeXTSTEP. After Apple Inc. acquired NeXT in 1997, NeXTSTEP became the foundation for Mac OS X, later renamed OS X and macOS.

Darwin, an open-source, Unix-based operating system, is the core of macOS and other Apple operating systems, such as iOS and watchOS. Darwin combines the XNU kernel, which incorporates the Mach kernel and components derived from BSD, with Apple’s I/O Kit device-driver framework, networking services, security features, and support for multiple file systems.

=== TCP/IP stack in Windows NT ===
Windows NT 3.1 used a BSD-derived TCP/IP implementation, and some BSD-based networking utilities for that stack were also included with Windows NT.

=== PlayStation system software ===
PlayStation system software is the updatable firmware and operating system used by PlayStation consoles. Its base operating systems known internally as CellOS or GameOS on the PlayStation 3 and Orbis OS on the PlayStation 4 are derived from FreeBSD and NetBSD. The PlayStation 3 system software uses the XrossMediaBar as its graphical user interface. Unlike the PlayStation 3, the PlayStation 4 does not use the XrossMediaBar as its primary user interface.

== See also ==
- List of software developed at universities
- List of BSD operating systems
- Comparison of BSD operating systems
- BSD licenses
- BSD Daemon
- Berkeley r-commands
