= Computer Systems Research Group =

Research group at University of California, Berkeley

Simplified evolution of Unix systems. The Mach kernel was a fork from BSD 4.3 that led to NeXTSTEP / OpenStep, upon which macOS and iOS are based.

The Computer Systems Research Group (CSRG) was a research organization at the University of California, Berkeley, dedicated to enhancing the AT&T Unix. Funded primarily by the DARPA. The CSRG focused on developing portable, high-performance Unix variants for academic and research environments, producing the Berkeley Software Distribution series.

== History ==
Professor Bob Fabry of Berkeley acquired a UNIX source license from AT&T in 1974. His group started to modify UNIX, and distributed their version as the Berkeley Software Distribution.

In April 1980, Fabry signed a contract with DARPA to develop UNIX even further and accommodate the specific requirements of the ARPANET. With this funding, Fabry created the Computer Systems Research Group.

By the early 1980s, CSRG was the best-known non-commercial Unix developer, and a majority of Unix sites used at least some Berkeley software. AT&T included some CSRG work in Unix System V.

During the 1970s and 1980s, AT&T and USL increased UNIX’s commercial licensing fees from approximately $20,000 to between $100,000 and $200,000. This created serious difficulties for small research laboratories and companies that relied on BSD. In response, the CSRG began replacing all source code derived from AT&T UNIX with independently developed code. This work culminated in the release of 4.4BSD-Lite in 1994. However, AT&T/USL disputed Berkeley’s right to distribute the system and filed a lawsuit against BSDI and the University of California, Berkeley. The case was settled later that year, allowing Berkeley to release the final BSD version, 4.4BSD-Lite2, in 1995.

The CSRG was subsequently disbanded in 1995.

== Innovations ==
CSRG made significant innovations, advancing the state of the art and influencing the design of other operating systems. For example, the sockets API remains in use in many operating systems today.

- The Berkeley Sockets API solved the problem of supporting multiple protocols (e.g. XNS and TCP/IP), and partially extended UNIX's "everything is a file" notion to these network protocols.
- The Berkeley Fast File System increased the block allocation size from 512 bytes to 4096 bytes (or larger), improving disk transfer performance, while also allowing "micro-blocks" as small as 128 bytes, which improved disk use.
- Job control signals allowed a user to suspend a job with a key-press (control-Z), and then continue running the job in the background under the C shell.

== Releases ==
Noteworthy releases of BSD were:

- 2.10 (and 2.11) BSD were the equivalent of 4.1 and 4.2 BSD. 2.X was for PDP-11; 4.X was for VAX. Both included TCP/IP, FFS (with the exception of long filenames), and, in 2.10/4.1, Berknet NFS (not TCP/IP NFS).
- 3.0 BSD, the first version to support virtual memory.
- 4.0 BSD, which included the job-control functionality (CTRL-Z), to suspend and restart a running job.
- 4.15 (interim) BSD, a special version which used BBN's TCP/IP stack.
- 4.2 BSD, which included BSD's own, full, TCP/IP stack, FFS, and NFS.

== Legacy ==
FreeBSD, NetBSD and OpenBSD are based on the 4.4BSD-Lite distribution and continue to play an important role in the open-source UNIX community today, including dictating the formatting style of C source code in their kernels. This style is known as Kernel Normal Form.

Alongside the Free Software Foundation and Linux, the CSRG laid the foundations of the open source community.

Former CSRG members include Keith Bostic, Bill Joy, Marshall Kirk McKusick, Samuel J. Leffler, Özalp Babaoğlu and Michael J. Karels, among others. The corporations Sun Microsystems, Berkeley Software Design and Sleepycat Software can be considered spin-off companies of CSRG. Berkeley Software Design was led by Robert Kolstad, who led the development of BSD Unix for supercomputers at Convex Computer.

== See also ==
- Berkeley Software Distribution
- Berkeley Software Design
- Mach Kernel
- Berkeley r-commands
