= Keith Bostic (software engineer) =

American software engineer (born 1959)

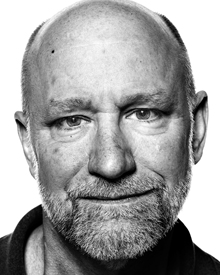
- Born: July 26, 1959 (age 67)
- Employers: UC Berkeley CSRG; Sleepycat / Oracle; WiredTiger / MongoDB
- Known for: nvi and Berkeley DB
- Spouse: Margo Seltzer
- Website: bostic.com

Keith Bostic (born July 26, 1959) is an American software engineer and one of the key people in the history of Berkeley Software Distribution (BSD) Unix and open-source software.

== Biography ==
In 1986, Bostic joined the Computer Systems Research Group (CSRG) at the University of California, Berkeley. He was one of the principal architects of the Berkeley 2BSD, 4.4BSD and 4.4BSD-Lite releases. Among many other tasks, he led the effort at CSRG to create a free software version of BSD Unix, which, in turn, enabled the creation of FreeBSD, NetBSD, and OpenBSD.

Bostic was a founder of Berkeley Software Design Inc. (BSDi), which produced BSD/OS, a proprietary version of BSD.

In 1993, the USENIX Association gave a Lifetime Achievement Award (Flame) to the Computer Systems Research Group, honoring 180 individuals, including Bostic, who contributed to the group's 4.4BSD-Lite release.

Bostic and his wife Margo Seltzer founded Sleepycat Software in 1996 to develop and commercialize Berkeley DB, an open-source, key-value database. Sleepycat Software was the first company to develop dual-licensed open-source software. In February 2006, the company was acquired by Oracle Corporation, where Bostic worked until 2008.

Bostic and Michael Cahill founded WiredTiger in 2010 to create a NoSQL database management system. In November 2014, the company was acquired by MongoDB, which employed Bostic.

Bostic is the author of nvi—a re-implementation of the classic text editor vi—and many other standard BSD and Linux utilities. He is a past member of the Association for Computing Machinery, IEEE, and several POSIX working groups, and a contributor to POSIX standards.

== Publications ==
- M. McKusick, K. Bostic, M. Karels, J. Quarterman: The Design and Implementation of the 4.4BSD Operating System, Addison-Wesley, April 1996, ISBN 0-201-54979-4. French translation published 1997, International Thomson Publishing, Paris, France, ISBN 2-84180-142-X.
- McIlroy, Peter M.; Bostic, Keith; McIlroy, M. Douglas (Winter 1993). "Engineering Radix Sort" (PDF). Computing Systems. 6 (1). USENIX Association: 5–27.
