= Sam Leffler =

American computer scientist

Samuel J Leffler is a computer scientist, known for his work on BSD, from the 1980s to FreeBSD in the present day. He created HylaFAX, LibTIFF, and the FreeBSD Wireless Device Drivers. He co-authored the Design and Implementation series of books.

While working for the Computer Systems Research Group (CSRG, UC Berkeley) at University of California, Berkeley, Leffler helped with 4.1 and 4.2 BSD release. After leaving Computer Systems Research Group, Leffler also worked at Lucasfilm, Pixar Animation Studios, Silicon Graphics, Alias Research, Softimage 3D, Cinetron Computer Systems and VMware. It while he was at Silicon Graphics that he developed HylaFAX. Later, Leffler became an independent system design consultant.

== Computer Animation Rendering ==
- André and Wally B. (1984) texturing/matteing
- Luxo Jr. (1986) rendering
- Tin Toy (1988) renderman team
- Toy Story (1995) modeling & animation system development/Renderman software development

== Bibliography ==
- S. Leffler, M. McKusick, M. Karels, J. Quarterman: The Design and Implementation of the 4.3BSD UNIX Operating System, Addison-Wesley, January 1989, ISBN 0-201-06196-1. German translation published June 1990, ISBN 3-89319-239-5. Japanese translation published June 1991, ISBN 4-621-03607-6 (out of print).
- S. Leffler, M. McKusick: The Design and Implementation of the 4.3BSD UNIX Operating System Answer Book, Addison-Wesley, April 1991, ISBN 0-201-54629-9. Japanese translation published January 1992, ISBN 978-4-8101-8039-8
