= Bill Joy =

American computer engineer (born 1954)

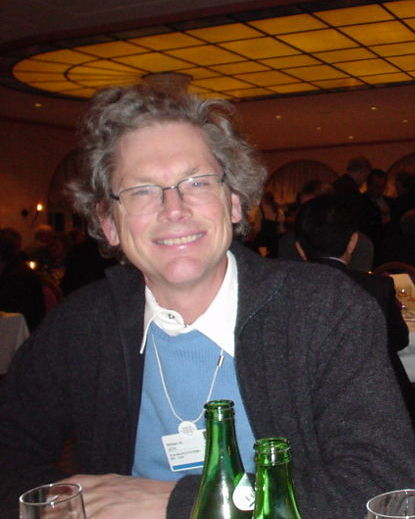
- Joy in 2003
- Born: William Nelson Joy; November 8, 1954 (age 72); Farmington Hills, Michigan, U.S.
- Education: University of Michigan (BS); University of California, Berkeley (MS)
- Known for: BSD • vi • csh • chroot • TCP/IP driver • co-founder of Sun Microsystems • Java • SPARC • Solaris • NFS • Why The Future Doesn't Need Us
- Children: 2
- Awards: ACM Grace Murray Hopper Award (1986); Elected to National Academy of Engineering (1999); Elected to American Academy of Arts and Sciences (1999); Fellow of the Computer History Museum (2011)
- Scientific career
- Fields: Computer science
- Academic advisors: Bob Fabry

William Nelson Joy (born November 8, 1954) is an American computer engineer and venture capitalist. He co-founded Sun Microsystems in 1982 along with Scott McNealy, Vinod Khosla, and Andy Bechtolsheim, and served as Chief Scientist and CTO at the company until 2003.

He played an integral role in the early development of BSD UNIX while being a graduate student at Berkeley, and he is the original author of the vi text editor. He also wrote the 2000 essay "Why The Future Doesn't Need Us", in which he expressed deep concerns over the development of modern technologies.

Joy was elected a member of the National Academy of Engineering (1999) for contributions to operating systems and networking software.

== Early career ==
Joy was born in the Detroit suburb of Farmington Hills, Michigan, to William Joy, a school vice-principal and counselor, and Ruth Joy. He earned a Bachelor of Science in electrical engineering from the University of Michigan and a Master of Science in electrical engineering and computer science from the University of California, Berkeley, in 1979.

While a graduate student at Berkeley, he worked for Bob Fabry's Computer Systems Research Group (CSRG) on the Berkeley Software Distribution (BSD) version of the Unix operating system. He initially worked on a Pascal compiler left at Berkeley by Ken Thompson, who had been visiting the university when Joy had just started his graduate work.

He later moved on to improving the Unix kernel, and also handled BSD distributions. Some of his most notable contributions were the ex and vi editors and the C shell. Joy's prowess as a computer programmer is legendary, with an oft-told anecdote that he wrote the vi editor in a weekend. Joy denies this assertion. A few of his other accomplishments have also been sometimes exaggerated; Eric Schmidt, CEO of Novell at the time, inaccurately reported during an interview in PBS's documentary Nerds 2.0.1 that Joy had personally rewritten the BSD kernel in a weekend. In 1980, he also wrote cat -v, about which Rob Pike and Brian W. Kernighan wrote that it went against Unix philosophy.

According to a Salon article, during the early 1980s, DARPA had contracted the company Bolt, Beranek and Newman (BBN) to add TCP/IP to Berkeley UNIX. Joy had been instructed to plug BBN's stack into Berkeley Unix, but he refused to do so, as he had a low opinion of BBN's TCP/IP. So, Joy wrote his own high-performance TCP/IP stack. According to John Gage:

BBN had a big contract to implement TCP/IP, but their stuff didn't work, and grad student Joy's stuff worked. So they had this big meeting and this grad student in a T-shirt shows up, and they said, "How did you do this?" And Bill said, "It's very simple – you read the protocol and write the code."

— John Gage

Rob Gurwitz, who was working at BBN at the time, disputes this version of events.

== Sun Microsystems ==
In 1982, after the firm had been going for six months, Joy, Sun's sixteenth employee, was brought in with full co-founder status at Sun Microsystems. At Sun, Joy was an inspiration for the development of NFS, the SPARC microprocessors, the Java programming language, Jini/JavaSpaces, and JXTA.

In 1986, Joy was awarded a Grace Murray Hopper Award by the ACM for his work on the Berkeley UNIX Operating System.

On September 9, 2003, Sun announced Joy was leaving the company and that he "is taking time to consider his next move and has no definite plans".

== Post-Sun activities ==
In 1999, Joy co-founded a venture capital firm, HighBAR Ventures, with two Sun colleagues, Andy Bechtolsheim and Roy Thiele-Sardiña. In January 2005 he was named a partner in venture capital firm Kleiner Perkins. There, Joy has made several investments in green energy industries, even though he does not have any credentials in the field. He once said, "My method is to look at something that seems like a good idea and assume it's true".

In 2011, he was inducted as a Fellow of the Computer History Museum for his work on the Berkeley Software Distribution (BSD) Unix system and the co-founding of Sun Microsystems.

== Technology concerns ==
In 2000, Joy gained notoriety with the publication of his article in Wired magazine, "Why The Future Doesn't Need Us", in which he declared, in what some have described as a "neo-Luddite" position, that he was convinced that growing advances in genetic engineering and nanotechnology would bring risks to humanity. He argued that intelligent robots would replace humanity, at the very least in intellectual and social dominance, in the relatively near future. He supports and promotes the idea of abandonment of GNR (genetics, nanotechnology, and robotics) technologies, instead of going into an arms race between negative uses of the technology and defense against those negative uses (good nano-machines patrolling and defending against Grey goo "bad" nano-machines). This stance of broad relinquishment was criticized by technologists such as technological-singularity thinker Ray Kurzweil, who instead advocates fine-grained relinquishment and ethical guidelines. Joy was also criticized by The American Spectator, which characterized Joy's essay as a (possibly unwitting) rationale for statism.

A bar-room discussion of these technologies with Ray Kurzweil started to set Joy's thinking along this path. He states in his essay that during the conversation, he became surprised that other serious scientists were considering such possibilities likely, and even more astounded at what he felt was a lack of consideration of the contingencies. After bringing the subject up with a few more acquaintances, he states that he was further alarmed by what he felt was that although many people considered these futures possible or probable, that very few of them shared as serious a concern for the dangers as he seemed to. This concern led to his in-depth examination of the issue and the positions of others in the scientific community on it, and eventually, to his current activities regarding it.

Despite this, he is a venture capitalist, investing in GNR technology companies. He has also raised a specialty venture fund to address the dangers of pandemic diseases, such as the H5N1 avian influenza and biological weapons.

== Joy's law ==
=== Of management ===
In his 2013 book Makers, author Chris Anderson credited Joy with establishing "Joy's law" based on a quip: "No matter who you are, most of the smartest people work for someone else [other than you]." His argument was that companies use an inefficient process by not hiring the best employees, only those they are able to hire. His "law" was a continuation of Friedrich Hayek's "The Use of Knowledge in Society" and warned that the competition outside of a company would always have the potential to be greater than the company itself.

=== Of computing ===
Joy devised a formula in 1983, also called Joy's law, stating that the peak computer speed doubles each year and thus is given by a simple function of time. Specifically,

$$S = 2^{Y-1984},$$

in which S is the peak computer speed attained during year Y, expressed in MIPS.
