= William Jolitz =

American software programmer (1957–2022)

William Frederick Jolitz
- Born: February 22, 1957; Muskegon, Michigan, U.S.
- Died: March 2, 2022 (aged 65)
- Occupation: Software Engineer
- Notable work: Developing the 386BSD operating system

William Frederick Jolitz (February 22, 1957 – March 2, 2022), commonly known as Bill Jolitz, was an American software engineer best known for developing the 386BSD operating system from 1989 to 1994 along with his wife Lynne Jolitz.

== Biography ==
Born in Muskegon, Michigan, on February 22, 1957, Jolitz was the third child of engineer William Leonard Jolitz and Norma Isabelle Jolitz, who both were from Duluth, Minnesota. Jolitz received his BA in Computer Science from the University of California, Berkeley.

Before 386BSD, Bill Jolitz designed the Symmetric 375 with an NSC 16032 (NS32000) CPU running 4.2BSD. His own Symmetric Computer Systems sold them from 1987 until 1988.

He and his wife resided in Los Gatos, California.

On March 2, 2022, Jolitz died from sarcoma. His death was announced on April 8, 2022, on The Unix Heritage Society (TUHS) mailing list.
