= FreeBSD Core Team =

The FreeBSD Project is run by FreeBSD committers, or developers who have direct commit access to the master Git repository. The FreeBSD Core Team exists to provide direction and is responsible for setting goals for the FreeBSD Project and to provide mediation in the event of disputes, and also takes the final decision in case of disagreement between individuals and teams involved in the project. The Core Team is also responsible for selecting individuals for other teams related to the development and ongoing maintenance of FreeBSD, such as the Security Officer, the Release Engineering team, and the Port Manager team. Finally, the Core Team also vote on nominations for new committers. In the event of a breach of internal rules of conduct, it falls to the core team to decide on sanctions. The FreeBSD Core Team would be the equivalent of a board of directors, if the FreeBSD Project were a company.

The FreeBSD Core Team is the equivalent of a similar body in the NetBSD Project called the Core Group.

== Current members ==
- Adam Weinberger
- Adrian Chadd
- Baptiste Daroussin
- Gleb Smirnoff
- Hiroki Sato
- Warner Losh
- Joseph Mingrone
- Kyle Evans
- Olivier Cochard-Labbé

== History and purpose ==
The FreeBSD Core Team began as an unofficial group of programmers, mainly consisting of those that initiated the FreeBSD Project itself. There were eleven members, and new members could only join through invitation.

As the FreeBSD project grew, so did the Core Team. By the year 2000, there were over 200 active committers, and the Core Team had expanded to 18 people. Some Core members were completely inactive, others far less active than many non-members, and there were even accusations of cronyism. The old, informal structure was no longer considered viable, and in early 2000 discussions were had regarding the future of the organisation. A set of bylaws was formulated by Jonathan Lemon, Warner Losh and Wes Peters. In a general vote by active committers on August 28, 2000, these bylaws passed by 117 votes to 5 against.

The FreeBSD Core Team is now an elected body comprising nine members from the pool of project developers with rights to directly change the Project repositories (committers). Committers are entitled to vote in Core elections if they have made at least one change to one of the Project's repositories in the past 12 months.

The first election took place in September 2000. Seventeen candidates stood for election, including eight of the existing Core Team. Five were re-elected, alongside four new members. Elections have taken place every two years since, the most recent election results being announced in May 2022. Elections shall be held two years after the last vote, even if the previous election was early. Elections may be held early if the membership of the Core Team fall below seven, or if petitioned for by 1/3 of active developers. The bylaws may be changed by a 2/3 majority of committers if at least 50% of active committers participate in the vote.

The Core Team appoints a secretary at its own discretion. This non-voting position exists to provide a central point of contact between external parties and the group, for keeping track of the agenda, and for acting as the interface between Core and other internal groups such as the Account Creation team. The Core Team Secretary is also responsible for writing and distributing monthly status reports to the FreeBSD developer community. The current Core Team Secretary is Sergio Carlavilla Delgado.

== Election procedure ==
The election lasts for five weeks. During the first week, committers who wish to run for election announce their intention to do so. In the four weeks that follow the application period, active committers vote for up to nine candidates.

After the voting period closes, votes are counted. Ties are resolved by unambiguously elected candidates; for instance, if there is a tie for ninth place, the first eight decide which of the tied candidates will join the team. The results are announced within one week of the end of the voting period, and the newly elected team enters office one week after the announcement.

== List of members ==
Name	2000	2002	2004	2006	2008	2010	2012	2014	2016	2018	2020	2022	2024	2026
Thomas Abthorpe							check							
Mathieu Arnold													check	
Satoshi Asami	check													
Gavin Atkinson							check	check						
John Baldwin		check	check			check	check		check	check		check		
Konstantin Belousov						check	check							
Tobias C. Berner												check	check	
Wilko Bulte				check	check	check								
Adrian Chadd														check
Sean Chittenden										check	check			
David Chisnall							check	check						
Olivier Cochard-Labbé													check	check
Dave Cottlehuber													check	
Baptiste Daroussin								check	check		check	check		check
Brooks Davis				check	check	check				check				
Kyle Evans											check			check
David Greenman	check													
Li-Wen Hsu												check	check	
Jordan Hubbard	check													
Mark Johnston											check			
Allan Jude									check	check			check	
Kris Kennaway					check									
Giorgos Keramidas				check	check									
Jun Kuriyama		check	check											
Greg Lehey	check	check										check		
Scott Long			check								check			
Warner Losh	check	check	check	check		check				check	check			check
Pav Lucistnik						check								
Ed Maste								check	check		check	check		
Joseph Mingrone														check
Kris Moore									check	check				
Mark Murray		check	check											
George V. Neville-Neil				check	check			check	check		check			
Colin Percival						check								
Wes Peters		check	check	check										
Mateusz Piotrowski												check		
Doug Rabson	check													
Attilio Rao							check							
Benedict Reuschling									check	check		check		
Benno Rice									check					
Jeff Roberson										check				
Hiroki Sato				check	check	check	check	check	check	check	check		check	check
Gleb Smirnoff								check					check	check
Mike Smith	check													
Murray Stokely		check	check	check	check									
Emmanuel Vadot												check		
Robert Watson	check	check	check	check	check	check		check						
Martin Wilke							check							
Peter Wemm	check	check	check		check		check	check						
Adam Weinberger														check
