= Robert Watson (computer scientist) =

British computer scientist (born 1977)

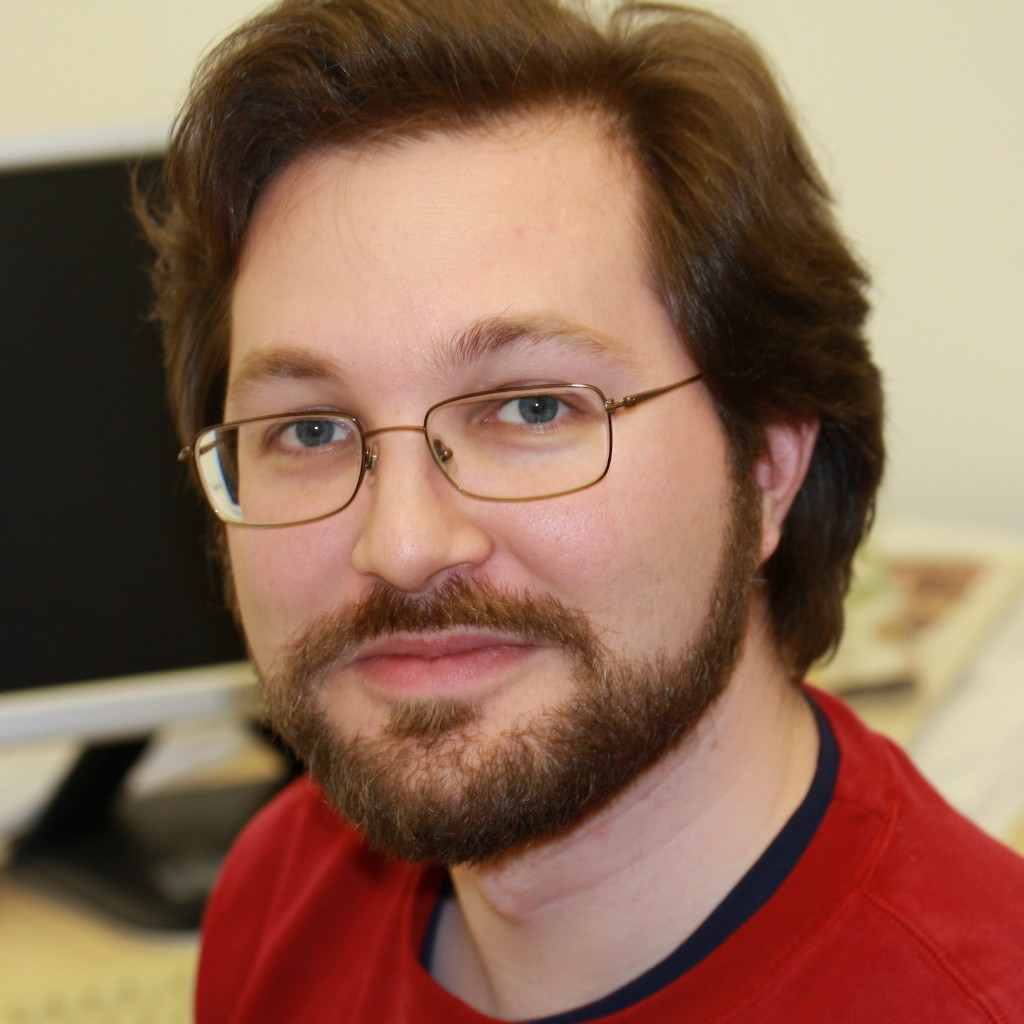
- Watson in 2008
- Born: 3 May 1977 (age 49); Harrow, London, England
- Education: Carnegie Mellon University; Wolfson College, Cambridge
- Known for: contributions to FreeBSD, TrustedBSD, OpenBSM
- Scientific career
- Fields: Computer security Operating systems Network stacks Programming languages Computer architecture
- Workplaces: Cambridge Computer Laboratory; University of Cambridge; St John's College, Cambridge
- Thesis: New approaches to operating system security extensibility (2011)
- Doctoral advisor: Ross Anderson
- Website: www.watson.org/~robert www.cl.cam.ac.uk/~rnw24 people.freebsd.org/~rwatson

Robert Nicholas Maxwell Watson (born 3 May 1977) is a FreeBSD developer, and founder of the TrustedBSD project. He is currently employed as a professor of systems, security, and architecture in the security research group at the University of Cambridge computer laboratory.

== Education ==
Watson graduated in computer science from Carnegie Mellon University and has attained a PhD from University of Cambridge. As well as Cambridge, he has worked at the National Institutes of Health, Carnegie Mellon University, Trusted Information Systems, Network Associates, McAfee, and SPARTA. He obtained a PhD in computer security from the University of Cambridge Computer Laboratory, supervised by Ross Anderson and sponsored by Google.

== Research ==
Watson's work has been supported by DARPA, Apple Computer, the United States Navy, and other US government agencies. His main research interests are network security and operating system security. His main open source software contributions include his work in developing the multi-threaded and multi-processor FreeBSD network stack, the TrustedBSD project, and OpenBSM. His writing has been featured in forums such as ACM's Queue Magazine, the USENIX Annual Technical Conference, BSDCon, and a Slashdot interview. He was also a FreeBSD Core Team member from 2000 to 2012. Watson is coauthor of the standard textbook The Design and Implementation of the FreeBSD Operating System (2nd ed., 2015) by Marshall Kirk McKusick.
