= OpenPAM =

BSD-licensed implementation of PAM

- Original author: Dag-Erling Smørgrav
- Developer: NAI Labs
- Stable release: Zingiber / May 31, 2025
- Written in: C
- Operating system: BSD, Linux, macOS et al.
- License: Modified BSD
- Website: http://www.openpam.org/
- Repository: git.des.dev/desdotdev/openpam.git

OpenPAM is a BSD-licensed implementation of Pluggable Authentication Module (PAM) used by FreeBSD, NetBSD, DragonFly BSD and macOS (starting with Snow Leopard), and offered as an alternative to Linux PAM in certain Linux distributions.

== Software ==
OpenPAM was developed for the FreeBSD Project by Dag-Erling Smørgrav and NAI Labs, the Security Research Division of Network Associates, Inc. under DARPA/SPAWAR contract N66001-01-C-8035 ("CBOSS"), as part of the DARPA CHATS research program.

On 1 January 2008, OpenPAM was one of eleven projects selected by Coverity for promotion to Rung 2 of their DHS-funded Open Source Hardening Project, which tracks bugs found in open-source software by Coverity's Prevent static program analysis tool. On 23 September 2009, OpenPAM was promoted to Rung 3, along with Ruby, Samba and Tor.
