= FreeBSD jail =

OS-level virtualisation

The jail mechanism is an implementation of FreeBSD's OS-level virtualisation that allows system administrators to partition a FreeBSD-derived computer system into several independent mini-systems called jails, all sharing the same kernel, with very little overhead. It is implemented through a system call, jail(2), as well as a userland utility, jail(8), plus, depending on the system, a number of other utilities. The functionality was committed into FreeBSD in 1999 by Poul-Henning Kamp after some period of production use by a hosting provider, and was first released with FreeBSD 4.0, thus being supported on a number of FreeBSD descendants, including DragonFly BSD, to this day.

== History ==
The need for FreeBSD jails came from a small shared-environment hosting provider's (R&D Associates, Inc.'s owner, Derrick T. Woolworth) desire to establish a clean, clear-cut separation between their own services and those of their customers, mainly for computer security and ease of administration (jail(8)). Instead of adding a new layer of fine-grained configuration options, the solution adopted by Poul-Henning Kamp was to compartmentalize the system – both its files and its resources – in such a way that only the right people are given access to the right compartments.

Jails were first introduced in FreeBSD version 4.0, that was released on March 14, 2000. Most of the original functionality is supported on DragonFly BSD, and several of the new features have been ported as well.

== Goals ==
FreeBSD jails mainly aim at three goals:

1. Virtualization: Each jail is a virtual environment running on the host machine with its own files, processes, user and superuser accounts. From within a jailed process, the environment is almost indistinguishable from a real system.
2. Security: Each jail is sealed from the others, thus providing an additional level of security.
3. Ease of delegation: The limited scope of a jail allows system administrators to delegate several tasks which require superuser access without handing out complete control over the system.

Unlike chroot jail, which only restricts processes to a particular view of the filesystem, the FreeBSD jail mechanism restricts the activities of a process in a jail with respect to the rest of the system. In effect, jailed processes are sandboxed. They are bound to specific IP addresses, and a jailed process cannot access divert or routing sockets. Raw sockets are also disabled by default, but may be enabled by setting the security.jail.allow_raw_sockets sysctl option. Additionally, interaction between processes that are not running in the same jail is restricted.

The jail(8) utility and jail(2) system call first appeared in FreeBSD 4.0. New utilities (for example jls(8) to list jails) and system calls (for example jail_attach(2) to attach a new process to a jail) that render jail management much easier were added in FreeBSD 5.1. The jail subsystem received further significant updates with FreeBSD 7.2, including support for multiple IPv4 and IPv6 addresses per jail and support for binding jails to specific central processing units.

=== Virtualization ===
With jail it is possible to create environments, each having its own set of utilities installed and its own configuration. Jails permit software packages to view the system egotistically, as if each package had the machine to itself. Jails can also have their own, independent, jailed superusers.

=== Security ===
FreeBSD jails are an effective way to increase the security of a server because of the separation between the jailed environment and the rest of the system (the other jails and the base system).

FreeBSD jails are limited in the following ways:

- Jailed processes cannot interact with processes in a different jail, or on the main host. For example, the ps command will only show the processes running in the jail.
- Modifying the running kernel by direct access and loading modules is prohibited. Modifying most sysctls and the securelevel is prohibited.
- Modifying the network configuration, including interfaces, interface or IP addresses, and the routing table, is prohibited. Accessing divert and routing sockets are also prohibited. Additionally, raw sockets are disabled by default. A jail is bound only to specific IP addresses and firewall rules cannot be changed. With the introduction of virtual network stack (VNET), the jails are free to modify their network configuration (including interfaces, IP addresses, etc.), provided the vnet is enabled for the jail.
- Mounting and unmounting filesystems is prohibited. Jails cannot access files above their root directory (i.e. a jail is chroot'ed).
- Jailed processes cannot create device nodes.

== See also ==
- bhyve – BSD Hypervisor
- chroot – Shell command and system call that changes the apparent root directory
- Comparison of platform virtualization software
- Hypervisor – Piece of software or hardware that creates and runs virtual machines
- List of FreeBSD malware
- Operating system-level virtualization – Operating system virtualization paradigm
- vkernel – OS-level virtualisation
