= BPC =

BPC may refer to:

== Information technology ==
- Binary Processing Chip
- Bits per component (or per channel, or per color), bpc, defining color depth
- BPC (time signal), a low frequency time code signal broadcast from China
- Business process customization, a function in process management software
- Bypass Paywalls Clean, a browser extension to circumvent paywalls

== Organizations ==
=== Education ===
- Blais Proteomic Center, Molecular Biology Core Facilities, at Dana–Farber Cancer Institute
- Bournemouth and Poole College, England
- Brewton–Parker College (now Brewton–Parker Christian University), Mount Vernon, Georgia, U.S.

=== Politics ===
- Bipartisan Policy Center, a Washington, D.C.-based think tank
- British Purchasing Commission, an organisation in the Second World War

=== Religion ===
- Bible Presbyterian Church, an American Protestant denomination

=== Trade and business ===
- Bangladesh Parjatan Corporation, a Bangladeshi government tourism organization
- BPC, an international payments software provider headquartered in Switzerland
- Braspress Air Cargo, a brazilian cargo airline (ICAO code BPC)
- British Patient Capital, a subsidiary of the British Business Bank
- British Phosphate Commission, managed extraction of phosphate from Christmas Island, Nauru, and Banaba Island 1920–1981
- British Polling Council, an association of market research companies
- British Poultry Council, a national trade group for the poultry meat industry
- Burns, Philp & Co, Limited, Australian Securities Exchange code

=== Medical science ===
- British Pharmacopoeia Commission, responsible for the British Pharmacopoeia
  - British Pharmaceutical Codex, supplementing the British Pharmacopoeia
- British Psychoanalytic Council, an association of psychoanalytic training institutions and professional associations

== Other uses ==
- Bâtiment de projection et de commandement (projection and command ship), the Mistral class of amphibious assault ships
- Battery Park City, a neighborhood in New York City
- Belgian Poker Challenge, poker tournament that defines the Belgian Poker Champion
- BPitch Control, a German record label
- Brushed Pottery culture, an archaeological culture
