= Business process customization =

Business Process Customization is a function in process management software, such as ERP, OA and ITIL, to allow enterprises to customize their work-flows in different software in order to make the software adapt to companies’ existing work-flows.

== Definition ==
Business Process Customization is the act of defining the whole work-flow from the start to closure in software.

== Method ==
Process Customization is achieved through JBPM (Java Business Process Management), which is an open source, flexible and extensible executable work-flow framework. It takes graphical process descriptions as input. A process is composed of tasks that are connected with sequence flows. Processes represent an execution flow. The graphical diagram (flow chart) of a process is used as the basis for the communication between non-technical users and developers.

When drawing the graphical diagram (flow chart), start and ending points should be always composed before tasks.

== Related Software ==
jBPM is a work-flow engine widely used by software companies for Process Customization. Some business process software such as Ahoova ITIL/ITSM/BSM and SAP (ERP) contain this function.

Here is an example of customizing business process in Ahoova ITIL/ITSM/BSM software to demonstrate this concept.

Users can customize business processes with Ahoova's web process designer. It takes only three steps to complete business process customization:

1. Draw processes accordingly with tools in Ahoova's web process designer;

2. Define process’ attributes;

3. Choose desired customized process for each business module, i.e.: request, problem, change, etc.
