= Pluggable Authentication Module =

Flexible mechanism for authenticating users

Structure

A pluggable authentication module (PAM) is a mechanism to integrate multiple low-level authentication schemes into a high-level application programming interface (API). PAM allows programs that rely on authentication to be written independently of the underlying authentication scheme.

== Mechanism ==
It was first proposed by Sun Microsystems in an Open Software Foundation Request for Comments (RFC) 86.0 dated October 1995. It was adopted as the authentication framework of the Common Desktop Environment. As a piece of stand-alone open-source infrastructure, PAM first appeared in Red Hat Linux 3.0.4 in August 1996 in the Linux PAM project. PAM is currently supported in the AIX operating system, DragonFly BSD, FreeBSD, HP-UX, Linux, macOS, NetBSD and Solaris.

Since no central standard of PAM behavior exists, there was a later attempt to standardize PAM as part of the X/Open UNIX standardization process, resulting in the X/Open Single Sign-on (XSSO) standard. This standard was not ratified, but the standard draft has served as a reference point for later PAM implementations (for example, OpenPAM).

== Criticisms ==
Since most PAM implementations do not interface with remote clients themselves, PAM, on its own, cannot implement Kerberos, the most common type of SSO used in Unix environments. This led to SSO's incorporation as the "primary authentication" portion of the would-be XSSO standard and the advent of technologies such as SPNEGO and SASL. This lack of functionality is also the reason SSH does its own authentication mechanism negotiation.

In most PAM implementations, pam_krb5 only fetches Ticket Granting Tickets, which involves prompting the user for credentials, and this is only used for the initial login in an SSO environment. To fetch a service ticket for a particular application, and not prompt the user to enter credentials again, that application must be specifically coded to support Kerberos. This is because pam_krb5 cannot itself get service tickets, although there are versions of PAM-KRB5 that are attempting to work around the issue.

== See also ==
- Identity management – the general topic
- Java Authentication and Authorization Service
- Name Service Switch – manages user databases
- System Security Services Daemon – SSO implementation based on PAM and NSS
