= HAMMER (file system) =

File system from DragonFly BSD

- Developer: Matthew Dillon
- Full name: HAMMER
- Introduced: July 21, 2008; 18 years ago with DragonFly BSD 2.0

Structures
- Directory contents: Modified B+ tree

Limits
- Max volume size: 1 EiB

Features
- Forks: No
- File system permissions: UNIX permissions
- Transparent compression: Yes
- Data deduplication: On demand

Other
- Supported operating systems: DragonFly BSD

HAMMER is a high-availability 64-bit file system developed by Matthew Dillon for DragonFly BSD using B+ trees. Its major features include infinite NFS-exportable snapshots, master–multislave operation, configurable history retention, fsckless-mount, and checksums to deal with data corruption. HAMMER also supports data block deduplication, meaning that identical data blocks will be stored only once on a file system. A successor, HAMMER2, was announced in 2011 and became the default in Dragonfly 5.2 (April 2018).

HAMMER2 was redesigned from the ground up to support enhanced clustering.

== Features ==
HAMMER file system provides configurable fine-grained and coarse-grained filesystem histories with online snapshots availability. Up to 65536 master (read–write) and slave (read-only) pseudo file systems (PFSs), with independent individual retention parameters and inode numbering, may be created for each file system; PFS may be mirrored to multiple slaves both locally or over network connection with near real-time performance. No file system checking is required on remount.

HAMMER supports volumes up to 1 EiB of storage capacity. File system supports CRC checksumming of data and metadata, online layout correction and data deduplication, and dynamic inodes allocation with an effectively unlimited number of inodes.

HAMMER2 supports online and batched deduplication, snapshots, directory entry indexing, multiple mountable filesystem roots, mountable snapshots, a low memory footprint, compression, encryption, zero-detection, data and metadata checksumming, and synchronization to other filesystems or nodes. It lacks support for extended file attributes ("xattr").

== Limitations ==
As of May 2020, regular maintenance is required to keep the file system clean and regain space after file deletions. By default, a cron job performs the necessary actions on DragonFly BSD daily. HAMMER does not support multi-master configurations.

== Performance ==
HAMMER is optimized to reduce the number of physical I/O operations to cover the most likely path, ensuring sequential access for optimal performance.

The following performance-related improvements were introduced in July 2011:

- Increased disk read speed in certain scenarios by implementing pulse-width modulated time-domain multiplexer on B-tree cursor operation
- Removed a deadlock stalling issue
- Improved read performance during heavy, concurrent file write operations

== Development ==
HAMMER was developed specifically for DragonFly BSD to "provide a feature-rich yet better designed analogue" of the then increasingly popular ZFS.

HAMMER was declared production-ready with DragonFly 2.2 in 2009; in 2012, design-level work shifted onto HAMMER2.

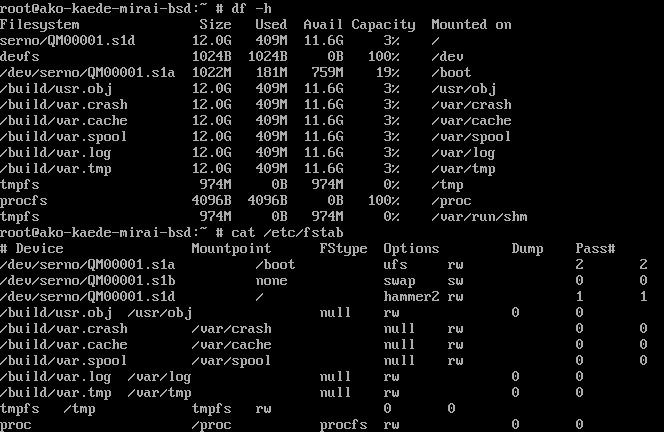
An example of file system layout of HAMMER2

The HAMMER2 file system was conceived by Matthew Dillon, who initially planned to bring it up to minimal working state by July 2012 and ship the final version in 2013. During Google Summer of Code 2013 Daniel Flores implemented compression in HAMMER2 using LZ4 and zlib algorithms. On June 4, 2014, DragonFly 3.8.0 was released featuring support for HAMMER2, although the file system was said to be not ready for use. On October 16, 2017, DragonFly 5.0 was released with bootable support for HAMMER2, though file-system status was marked as experimental.

HAMMER2 had a long incubation and development period before it officially entered production in April 2018, as the recommended root filesystem in the Dragonfly BSD 5.2 release.

As of 2019, HAMMER is now often referred to as HAMMER1 to avoid confusion with HAMMER2, although an official renaming has not happened. Both filesystems are independent of each other due to different on-disk formats, and continue to receive separate updates and improvements independently.

Dillon continues to actively develop and maintain HAMMER2 as of June 2020.

== See also ==
- Comparison of file systems
- List of file systems
- ZFS
- Btrfs
- OpenZFS
