= Scheduler activations =

Operating system threading mechanism

Scheduler activations are a threading mechanism that, when implemented in an operating system's process scheduler, provide kernel-level thread functionality with user-level thread flexibility and performance. This mechanism uses a so-called "N:M" strategy that maps some N number of application threads onto some M number of kernel entities, or "virtual processors." This is a compromise between kernel-level ("1:1") and user-level ("N:1") threading. In general, "N:M" threading systems are more complex to implement than either kernel or user threads, because both changes to kernel and user-space code are required.

Scheduler activations were proposed by Anderson, Bershad, Lazowska, and Levy in Scheduler Activations: Effective Kernel Support for the User-Level Management of Parallelism (1991). Support was implemented in the NetBSD kernel by Nathan Williams, but has since been abandoned in favor of 1:1 threading. FreeBSD had a similar threading implementation called Kernel Scheduled Entities which is also being retired in favor of 1:1 threading. Scheduler activations were also implemented as a patch for the Linux kernel by Vincent Danjean: Linux Activations, the user-level part being done in the Marcel thread library.
