= Open Connect =

Content delivery network by Netflix

Open Connect is a content distribution network specifically developed by Netflix to deliver its TV shows and movies to avoid traffic and fees.

Netflix provides physical appliances to internet service providers that allow them to avoid traffic during peak hours of streaming or sustain the anticipated ones. By shipping copies of content to these appliances ahead of time, the devices can store duplicates of titles, thereby reducing the network burden. Also, Netflix places its servers in locations with the highest number of subscribers and forms partnerships with ISP networks or IXPs.

Furthermore, Netflix adapts its content to the quality of the network. This is achieved by sending three copies of each title, each at a different quality level, to its servers. For example, if a user's ISP is overwhelmed or the Internet connection is poor, the system can select a lower-bitrate version of the title.

== History ==
Netflix launched Open Connect in 2012. Since then, Netflix has spent over $1 billion to develop and distribute more than 8,000 Open Connect Appliances (OCA). The service started working on the free-of-charge distribution of OCAs in cooperation with ISPs. So far, more than 1,000 ISPs have acquired and installed OCAs, which has allowed them to save $1.25 billion by 2021.

In the case of an OCA that is hosted at an IXP, Netflix maintains ownership of the OCA and is responsible for covering its own expenses such as power consumption, colocation fees, cross-connect fees, and other related costs. Netflix has installed OCAs in over 52 IXPs around the world, enabling a connection with any ISP.

== Deployment ==
=== IX deployment ===
Netflix deploys OCAs within IXPs located in major Netflix markets around the world. These OCAs are interconnected with ISPs present at the same location through free public or private peering.

=== Embedded deployment ===
OCAs are directly installed within ISP networks. While Netflix supplies the server hardware at no cost, ISPs are responsible for providing space, power, and connectivity.

== Requirements ==
Requirements for deploying embedded appliances
Criteria	Description
Network	ISP with a public ASN
Netflix Viewer Traffic	Minimum 5 Gbit/s of peak Netflix traffic
AWS Connectivity	Accessible control plane services running in AWS
Physical Connection	2–6 x 10 Gbit/s optical Ethernet ports in a LACP LAG per OCA
Maximum Power Supply Draw	750 W

Three primary factors that determine the number of appliances that need to be deployed are:

- The network architecture requirements
- The maximum amount of Netflix traffic to be delivered from a particular site
- The availability and failover options that can be implemented at that site

== Hardware ==
Open Connect is a combination of local servers, referred to as OCAs, and additional infrastructure. Netflix has developed storage appliances that are used to store the content in many IX locations globally and are embedded at larger ISP partner locations. The storage holds up to 350 TB, therefore, if something from storage becomes popular, Netflix will move that title onto the other server called flash server which serves large traffic.

== Software ==
These are used software for designing Open Connect Appliance Software:

- Operating system – FreeBSD
- Web server – NGINX
- Routing Intelligence Proxy – BIRD internet routing daemon
- IP support – IPv4 and IPv6
- Other software handle content management and transmits information regarding the system's health and other statistics to the Open Connect supporting services at Netflix.

== Benefits ==
- Open Connect permits ISPs to circumvent the expenses associated with transit charge and costly international backhaul capacity by delivering the traffic directly to the ISP instead of through a transit link.
- If an ISP has multiple OCAs in place, it is possible to transmit the traffic to the consumer from a server nearby, which reduces costs for the core network capacity.
- Open Connect assists wideband networks in retaining their customers by preventing slow speed and instability. Moreover, if one element fails, it is possible to redirect the traffic to other servers, which minimizes the risk of downtime.
- Netflix invests in delivery infrastructure, such as OCAs, as well as compression technology, to optimize the delivery of its content and support the growing global demand for video content and broadband internet access.
- The OCAs report their health values and receive their configurations from the Open Connect supporting services (if it is reachable from the Network Operations Center). Netflix also automatically incorporates feedback on the health information into its content routing decisions.
