= Matthew Dillon =

American software engineer (born 1966)

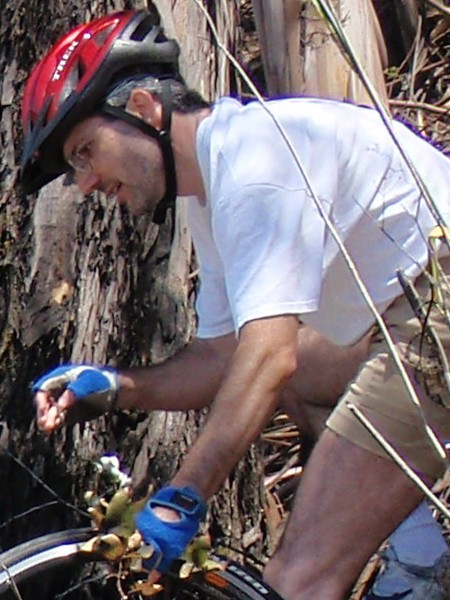
- Matthew Dillon on bicycle, August 2008
- Born: 1 July 1966 (age 60); San Francisco
- Education: University of California, Berkeley
- Occupation: Software engineer
- Known for: Amiga DICE, DME; FreeBSD, DragonFly BSD, HAMMER
- Website: apollo.backplane.com

Matthew Dillon (born 1966) is an American software engineer known for Amiga software, contributions to FreeBSD and for starting and leading the DragonFly BSD project since 2003.

== Biography ==
Dillon studied electronic engineering and computer science at the University of California, Berkeley, where he first became involved with BSD in 1985. He also became known for his Amiga programming, his C compiler DICE and his work on the Linux kernel. He founded and worked at Best Internet from 1994 until 1997, contributing to FreeBSD in that time. His "Diablo" internet news transit program was very popular with many ISPs.

In 1997, Dillon gained commit access to the FreeBSD code and heavily contributed to the virtual memory subsystem, amongst other contributions.

Concerned with problems he saw in the direction FreeBSD 5.x was headed in regards to concurrency, and coupled with the fact that Dillon's access to the FreeBSD source code repository was revoked due to a falling-out with other FreeBSD developers, he started the DragonFly BSD project in 2003, implementing the SMP model using light-weight kernel threads. The DragonFly project also led to the development of a new userspace kernel virtualisation technique in 2006, called Virtual Kernel, originally to ease the development and testing of subsequent kernel-level features; a new file system, called HAMMER, which he created using B-trees; HAMMER was declared production-ready with DragonFly 2.2 in 2009; and, subsequently, HAMMER2, declared stable in 2018 with DragonFly 5.2.

Most recently, Dillon has gotten a number of headlines around CPU errata. In 2007, this was after Theo de Raadt of OpenBSD raised the alarm around the seriousness of some of the errata for Intel Core 2 family of CPUs. Dillon has independently evaluated Intel's errata, and did an overview of Intel Core errata as well, suggesting that several of them were so serious as to warrant avoiding any processor where the issues remain unfixed. Dillon has since been a fan of AMD processors, and, subsequently in 2012, he has discovered a brand-new deficiency in some AMD processors for which no existing erratum existed at the time. Dillon continued his work around CPU issues as late as 2018, presenting solutions to tackle the latest security vulnerabilities like Meltdown, some of which have been subsequently adopted by OpenBSD as well.

Dillon was a frequent guest on bsdtalk during the runtime of the show, and was interviewed several times for KernelTrap.
