= Kernfs (BSD) =

Pseudo file system in the Berkeley Software Distribution

In the Berkeley Software Distribution (BSD) and its descendants, kernfs is a pseudo file system that provides access to information on the currently running kernel. The file system itself and its content are dynamically generated when the operating system is booted, and the kernfs is often mounted at the /kern directory. As a result of its nature, kernfs does not consist of actual files on a storage device, allowing instead processes to retrieve system information by accessing virtual files.

kernfs first appeared in 4.4BSD, and NetBSD 6.0 continues to use kernfs by default while mounting it at the canonical /kern mount point.

== See also ==
- procfs – a special file system in Unix-like operating systems that presents information about processes and other system information
- tmpfs – a common name for a temporary file storage facility on many Unix-like operating systems
