= DragonFly BSD =

Free and open-source operating system

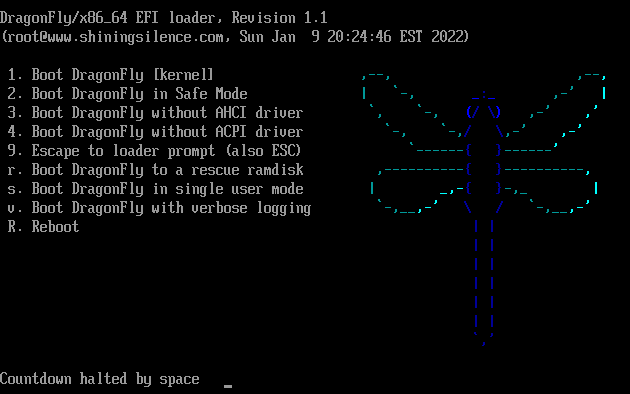
- DragonFly BSD 6.2.1 UEFI boot loader
- Developer: Matthew Dillon
- OS family: Unix-like (BSD)
- Working state: Current
- Source model: Open source
- Initial release: 1.0 / 12 July 2004; 22 years ago
- Latest release: 6.4.2 / 9 May 2025; 17 months ago
- Repository: gitweb.dragonflybsd.org
- Available in: English
- Package manager: DPorts, pkg
- Supported platforms: x86-64
- Kernel type: Hybrid
- Userland: BSD
- Default user interface: Unix shell
- License: BSD
- Official website: www.dragonflybsd.org

DragonFly BSD is a free and open-source Unix-like operating system forked from FreeBSD 4.8. Matthew Dillon, an Amiga developer in the late 1980s and early 1990s, and FreeBSD developer between 1994 and 2003, began working on DragonFly BSD in June 2003 and announced it on the FreeBSD mailing lists on 16 July 2003.

Dillon started DragonFly in the belief that the techniques adopted for threading and symmetric multiprocessing in FreeBSD 5 would lead to poor performance and maintenance problems. He sought to correct these anticipated problems within the FreeBSD project. Due to conflicts with other FreeBSD developers over the implementation of his ideas, his ability to directly change the codebase was eventually revoked. Despite this, the DragonFly BSD and FreeBSD projects still work together, sharing bug fixes, driver updates, and other improvements. Dillon named the project after photographing a dragonfly in his yard, while he was still working on FreeBSD.

Intended as the logical continuation of the FreeBSD 4.x series, DragonFly has diverged significantly from FreeBSD, implementing lightweight kernel threads (LWKT), an in-kernel message passing system, and the HAMMER file system. Many design concepts were influenced by AmigaOS.

== System design ==
=== Kernel ===
The kernel messaging subsystem being developed is similar to those found in microkernels such as Mach, though it is less complex by design. DragonFly's messaging subsystem has the ability to act in either a synchronous or asynchronous fashion, and attempts to use this capability to achieve the best performance possible in any given situation.

According to developer Matthew Dillon, progress is being made to provide both device input/output (I/O) and virtual file system (VFS) messaging capabilities that will enable the remainder of the project goals to be met. The new infrastructure will allow many parts of the kernel to be migrated out into userspace; here they will be more easily debugged as they will be smaller, isolated programs, instead of being small parts entwined in a larger chunk of code. Additionally, the migration of select kernel code into userspace has the benefit of making the system more robust; if a userspace driver crashes, it will not crash the kernel.

System calls are being split into userland and kernel versions and being encapsulated into messages. This will help reduce the size and complexity of the kernel by moving variants of standard system calls into a userland compatibility layer, and help maintain forwards and backwards compatibility between DragonFly versions. Linux and other Unix-like OS compatibility code is being migrated out similarly.

==== Threading ====
As support for multiple instruction set architectures complicates symmetric multiprocessing (SMP) support, DragonFly BSD now limits its support to the x86-64 platform. DragonFly originally ran on the x86 architecture, however, as of version 4.0, it is no longer supported. Since version 1.10, DragonFly supports 1:1 userland threading (one kernel thread per userland thread), which is regarded as a relatively simple solution that is also easy to maintain. Inherited from FreeBSD, DragonFly also supports multi-threading.

In DragonFly, each CPU has its own thread scheduler. Upon creation, threads are assigned to processors and are never preemptively switched from one processor to another; they are only migrated by the passing of an inter-processor interrupt (IPI) message between the CPUs involved. Inter-processor thread scheduling is also accomplished by sending asynchronous IPI messages. One advantage to this clean compartmentalization of the threading subsystem is that the processors' on-board caches in symmetric multiprocessor systems do not contain duplicated data, allowing for higher performance by giving each processor in the system the ability to use its own cache to store different things to work on.

The LWKT subsystem is being employed to partition work among multiple kernel threads (for example, in the networking code, there is one thread per protocol per processor), reducing competition by removing the need to share certain resources among various kernel tasks.

==== Shared resources protection ====
In order to run safely on multiprocessor machines, access to shared resources (like files, data structures) must be serialized so that threads or processes do not attempt to modify the same resource at the same time. In order to prevent multiple threads from accessing or modifying a shared resource simultaneously, DragonFly employs critical sections, and serializing tokens to prevent concurrent access. While both Linux and FreeBSD 5 employ fine-grained mutex models to achieve higher performance on multiprocessor systems, DragonFly does not. Until recently, DragonFly also employed spls, but these were replaced with critical sections.

Much of the system's core, including the LWKT subsystem, the IPI messaging subsystem and the new kernel memory allocator, are lockless, meaning that they work without using mutexes, with each process operating on a single CPU. Critical sections are used to protect against local interrupts, individually for each CPU, guaranteeing that a thread currently being executed will not be preempted.

Serializing tokens are used to prevent concurrent accesses from other CPUs, and may be held simultaneously by multiple threads, ensuring that only one of those threads is running at any given time. Blocked or sleeping threads therefore do not prevent other threads from accessing the shared resource, unlike a thread that is holding a mutex. Among other things, the use of serializing tokens prevents many of the situations that could result in deadlocks and priority inversions when using mutexes, as well as greatly simplifying the design and implementation of a many-step procedure that would require a resource to be shared among multiple threads. The serializing token code is evolving into something quite similar to the "Read-copy-update" feature now available in Linux. Unlike Linux's current RCU implementation, DragonFly's is being implemented such that only processors competing for the same token are affected rather than all processors in the computer.

DragonFly switched to multiprocessor safe slab allocator, which requires neither mutexes nor blocking operations for memory assignment tasks. It was eventually ported into standard C library in the userland, where it replaced FreeBSD's malloc implementation.

==== Virtual kernel ====
Since release 1.8, DragonFly has a virtualization mechanism similar to User-mode Linux, allowing a user to run another kernel in the userland. The virtual kernel (vkernel) is run in completely isolated environment with emulated network and storage interfaces, thus simplifying testing kernel subsystems and clustering features.

The vkernel has two important differences from the real kernel: it lacks many routines for dealing with the low-level hardware management, and it uses C standard library (libc) functions in place of in-kernel implementations wherever possible. As both real and virtual kernel are compiled from the same code base, this effectively means that platform-dependent routines and re-implementations of libc functions are clearly separated in a source tree.

The vkernel runs on top of hardware abstractions provided by the real kernel. These include the kqueue-based timer, the console (mapped to the virtual terminal where vkernel is executed), the disk image, and virtual kernel Ethernet device (VKE), tunneling all packets to the host's tap interface.

=== Package management ===
Third-party software is available on DragonFly as binary packages via pkgng or from a native ports collection – DPorts.

DragonFly originally used the FreeBSD Ports collection as its official package management system, but starting with the 1.4 release switched to NetBSD's pkgsrc system, which was perceived as a way of lessening the amount of work needed for third-party software availability. Eventually, maintaining compatibility with pkgsrc proved to require more effort than was initially anticipated, so the project created DPorts, an overlay on top of the FreeBSD Ports collection.

=== CARP support ===
The initial implementation of Common Address Redundancy Protocol (commonly referred to as CARP) was finished in March 2007. As of 2011, CARP support is integrated into DragonFly BSD.

=== HAMMER file systems ===
Alongside the Unix File System, which is typically the default file system on BSDs, DragonFly BSD supports the HAMMER and HAMMER2 file systems. HAMMER2 is the default file system as of version 5.2.0.

HAMMER was developed specifically for DragonFly BSD to provide a feature-rich yet better designed analogue of the increasingly popular ZFS. HAMMER supports configurable file system history, snapshots, checksumming, data deduplication and other features typical for file systems of its kind.

HAMMER2, the successor of the HAMMER file system, is now considered stable, used by default, and the focus of further development. Plans for its development were initially shared in 2012. In 2017, Dillon announced that the next DragonFly BSD version (5.0.0) would include a usable, though still experimental, version of HAMMER2, and described features of the design. With the release of version 5.2.0, HAMMER2 became the new default file system.

=== devfs ===
In 2007, DragonFly BSD received a new device file system (devfs), which dynamically adds and removes device nodes, allows accessing devices by connection paths, recognises drives by serial numbers and removes the need for pre-populated /dev file system hierarchy. It was implemented as a Google Summer of Code 2009 project.

=== Application snapshots ===
DragonFly BSD supports Amiga-style resident applications feature: it takes a snapshot of a large, dynamically linked program's virtual memory space after loading, allowing future instances of the program to start much more quickly than it otherwise would have. This replaces the prelinking capability that was being worked on earlier in the project's history, as the resident support is much more efficient. Large programs, like those found in KDE Software Compilation with many shared libraries, will benefit the most from this support.

== Development and distribution ==
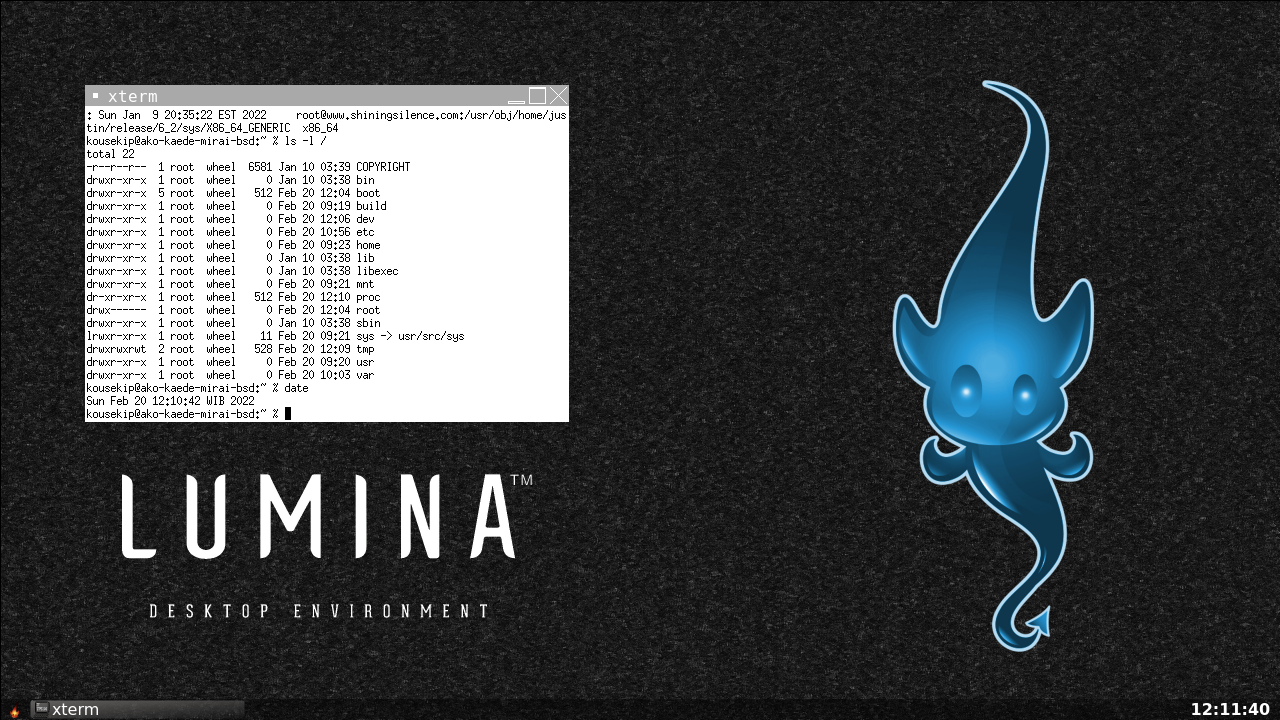
DragonFly BSD 6.2.1 with Lumina desktop environment

As with FreeBSD and OpenBSD, the developers of DragonFly BSD are slowly replacing pre-function prototype-style C code with more modern, ANSI equivalents. Similar to other operating systems, DragonFly's version of the GNU Compiler Collection has an enhancement called the Stack-Smashing Protector (ProPolice) enabled by default, providing some additional protection against buffer overflow based attacks. As of 23 July 2005, the kernel is no longer built with this protection by default.

Being a derivative of FreeBSD, DragonFly has inherited an easy-to-use integrated build system that can rebuild the entire base system from source with only a few commands. The DragonFly developers use the Git version control system to manage changes to the DragonFly source code. Unlike its parent FreeBSD, DragonFly has both stable and unstable releases in a single source tree, due to a smaller developer base.

Like the other BSD kernels (and those of most modern operating systems), DragonFly employs a built-in kernel debugger to help the developers find kernel bugs. Furthermore, as of October 2004, a debug kernel, which makes bug reports more useful for tracking down kernel-related problems, is installed by default, at the expense of a relatively small quantity of disk space. When a new kernel is installed, the backup copy of the previous kernel and its modules are stripped of their debugging symbols to further minimize disk space usage.

=== Distribution media ===
The operating system is distributed as a Live CD and Live USB that boots into a complete DragonFly system. It includes the base system and a complete set of manual pages, and may include source code and useful packages in future versions. The advantage of this is that with a single CD users can install the software onto a computer, use a full set of tools to repair a damaged installation, or demonstrate the capabilities of the system without installing it. Daily snapshots are available from the master site for those who want to install the most recent versions of DragonFly without building from source.

Like the other free and open-source BSDs, DragonFly is distributed under the terms of the modern version of the BSD license.

=== Release history ===
Reverse chronological:

Version	Date	Changes
6.4.2	9 May 2025	Bug fixes
6.4.1	30 April 2025	Bug fixes
6.4	30 December 2022	
6.2.1	9 January 2022	NVMM ported to DragonFly; Added support for growfs to changing the size of an existing HAMMER2 volume.; Added xdisk. Remote HAMMER2 disks can be mounted (experimental feature); Imported amdgpu driver, matches Linux 4.19 support.; Updated DRM
6.0	10 May 2021	Improved work of 'dsynth' - tool that allow to maintain local DPort repository; Removed support of MAP_VPAGETABLE mmap(), as result no 'vkernel' in this release able to work
5.8	3 March 2020	
5.6	17 June 2019	Improved virtual memory system; Updates to radeon and ttm; Performance improvements for HAMMER2
5.4	3 December 2018	Updated drivers for network, virtual machines & display; GCC 8.0 with the previous GCC releases; Hammer with more issue fixes
5.2	10 April 2018	HAMMER2 filesystem is now considered stable; Meltdown and Spectre mitigation support; ipfw Updates; Improved graphics support
5.0	16 October 2017	New HAMMER2 filesystem; Can now support over 900,000 processes on a single machine; Improved i915 support; IPFW better performance
4.8	27 March 2017	Initial AMD Ryzen support; Improved i915 support; Improved kernel performance; eMMC boot support; LibreSSL replaced OpenSSL in base; GCC 5.4.1; LTO support; Initial Clang framework; UEFI install support
4.6	2 August 2016	Improved i915 and Radeon support; NVM Express support; Improved SMP performance; Improved network performance; Preliminary support for UEFI booting; autofs imported from FreeBSD, amd removed
4.4	7 December 2015	GCC 5.2; gold now the default linker; Improved i915 and Radeon support; Complete overhaul of the locale system; Collation support for named locales; Regex library replaced with TRE; Symbol versioning support in libc; Numerous HAMMER cleanups and fixes
4.2	29 June 2015	GCC 5.1.1; Improved i915 and Radeon support; Improved sound support; Improved support for memory controller and temperature sensors; Path MTU Discovery enabled by default; SCTP support removed; Sendmail replaced by DMA; GNU Info pages removed
4.0	25 November 2014	Non-locking, multi-threading PF; Related networking better-threaded for improved throughput; Procctl security feature in kernel; Support for up to 256 CPUs; Improved wireless networking support; Rust and Free Pascal now supported; i915 support greatly improved; GCC 4.7.4
3.8	4 June 2014	Dynamic root and PAM support; USB4BSD now default; Native C-State support for Intel CPUs; TCP port token split for better TCP connect(2) performance; GCC 4.7.3; HAMMER2 in system ( not ready for production use ); Final 32-bit release
3.6	25 November 2013	SMP contention reduction; Kernel modesetting for Intel and AMD GPUs; Hardware acceleration for Intel GPUs up to Ivy Bridge
3.4	29 April 2013	New package manager, DPorts, introduced; GCC 4.7; Improved CPU usage and tmpfs performance under extreme load
3.2	2 November 2012	Multiprocessor-capable kernel became mandatory.; Performance improvements in the scheduler.; USB4BSD imported from FreeBSD.; PUFFS imported from NetBSD.
3.0	22 February 2012	Multiprocessor-capable kernel became the default; HAMMER performance improvements; TrueCrypt-compatible encryption support; dm-crypt replaced with a compatible BSD-licensed library; Enhanced POSIX compatibility; Device driver for ECC memory; Major network protocol stack and SMP improvements; ACPI-related improvements
2.10	26 April 2011	Giant lock removed from every area except the virtual memory subsystem; HAMMER deduplication; GCC 4.4; Bridging system rewritten; Major performance improvements
2.8	30 October 2010	Wi-Fi stack imported from FreeBSD; Logical volume management; dm-crypt; New disk scheduler; Reduced giant lock usage
2.6	6 April 2010	Swapcache; tmpfs imported from NetBSD; HAMMER and general I/O improvements
2.4	16 September 2009	devfs; New AHCI driver, including full NCQ support; NFS improvements; Full x86-64 support
2.2	17 February 2009	HAMMER officially production-ready; Major stability improvements; New release media: LiveCD and LiveUSB
2.0	20 July 2008	Major HAMMER improvements
1.12	26 February 2008	Sensor framework imported from FreeBSD; Bluetooth stack; GCC 4.1; DragonFly Mail Agent (DMA), a stub MTA; Support for the 386 CPU dropped; Preliminary x86-64 support (not functional); Experimental HAMMER support
1.10	6 August 2007	Userland threading system; Advanced Host Controller Interface support; GUID Partition Table support
1.8	30 January 2007	Virtual kernel implementation
1.6	24 July 2006	New random number generator; IEEE 802.11 framework refactored; Major giant lock, clustering, and userland VFS improvements; Major stability improvements
1.4	7 January 2006	GCC 3.4; pkgsrc used by default; Citrus imported from NetBSD
1.2	8 April 2005	TCP SACK; TCP Performance tuning; ALTQ and PF; Thread-local storage; Console over IEEE 1394; Namecache infrastructure rewritten; X11 support; pkgsrc support
1.0	12 July 2004	Technology showcase; New BSD Installer; LWKT subsystem and lightweight ports/messaging system; Mostly MP-safe networking stack; Lockless memory allocator; Variant symlinks; Application checkpointing support.

== See also ==
- Comparison of BSD operating systems
- Comparison of open-source operating systems
- Comparison of operating system kernels
- Lumina (desktop environment)
