= Comparison of operating systems =

These tables provide a comparison of operating systems, of computer devices, as listing general and technical information for a number of widely used and currently available PC or handheld (including smartphone and tablet computer) operating systems. The article "Usage share of operating systems" provides a broader, and more general, comparison of operating systems that includes servers, mainframes and supercomputers.

Because of the large number and variety of available Linux distributions, they are all grouped under a single entry; see comparison of Linux distributions for a detailed comparison. There is also a variety of BSD and DOS operating systems, covered in comparison of BSD operating systems and comparison of DOS operating systems.

== Nomenclature ==
The nomenclature for operating systems varies among providers and sometimes within providers. For purposes of this article the terms used are;

kernel
In some operating systems, the OS is split into a low level region called the kernel and higher level code that relies on the kernel. Typically the kernel implements processes but its code does not run as part of a process.

hybrid kernel
monolithic kernel

Nucleus
In some operating systems there is OS code permanently present in a contiguous region of memory addressable by unprivileged code; in IBM systems this is typically referred to as the nucleus. The nucleus typically contains both code that requires special privileges and code that can run in an unprivileged state. Typically some code in the nucleus runs in the context of a dispatching unit, e.g., address space, process, task, thread, while other code runs independent of any dispatching unit. In contemporary operating systems unprivileged applications cannot alter the nucleus.

License and pricing policies vary widely among different systems. Among others, the tables below use the following terms:

BSD
BSD licenses are a family of permissive free software licenses, imposing minimal restrictions on the use and distribution of covered software.

bundled
The fee is included in the price of the hardware

== General information ==
Name	Creator	Initial public release	Predecessor	Current stable version	Latest release date	Cost	Preferred license (Note: Most OS distributions include bundled software with various other licenses.)	Target system type	Availability
AIX	IBM	1986	UNIX System V Release 3	7.3 TL4 (7.3.4)	December 2025	Commercial	Proprietary	Server, NAS, workstation	Image, Bundled
AIX/370	IBM	1989	IX/370	Release 2.1?	February 22, 1991	Non-free	Proprietary	IBM System/370 AIX/ESA V1 & V2	Image, Bundled
AIX/ESA	IBM	1992	AIX/370, OSF/1	Version 2 Release 2	February 26, 1993	Non-free	Proprietary	ESA/370; IBM System/390	Image, Bundled
AmigaOS classic	Commodore International, Haage & Partner, Hyperion Entertainment	1985	TRIPOS (as the disk operating component of AmigaOS)	3.2.2.1	April 23, 2023	Bundled with hardware up to version 3.0 (Amiga International hardware came with 3.1); versions 2.1, 3.0, 3.1, 3.5, 3.9 and the more recent 3.2 (2021) also available as separate packages	Proprietary, open source clone available under AROS Public License	Workstation, personal computer	Bundled
AmigaOS 4	Hyperion Entertainment	2004	AmigaOS classic	4.1 Final Edition Update 3	October 19, 2025	4.0 bundled with hardware; 4.0 for classic and 4.1 available as standalone package at €29	Proprietary	Workstation, personal computer	Image, Bundled
Android	Android, Inc., Google	2008	None	17	June 16, 2026	No cost	AOSP: Apache-2.0; Linux: GPL-2.0-only	Smartphone, tablet computer	Image, Bundled
ArcaOS	Arca Noae, LLC	2017	OS/2	5.1.2	March 8, 2026	Personal edition US$139.00; Commercial edition US$249.00	Proprietary	Server, workstation, personal computer	Image, Bundled
Classic Mac OS (retronym; had no name originally, later Macintosh System Software, discontinued in 2000)	Apple Computer, Inc. (now Apple Inc.)	1984	None (Note: "Hungarian". The Original Macintosh Anecdotes.. Although Lisa OS ran on the same, but a slower variant, microprocessor and was developed by Apple Computer Inc. at the same time as Classic Mac OS, they were developed as different projects, only sharing a similar GUI between them.) (Note: Mac OS 7.6 was the first Macintosh system software to be labeled Mac OS. Operating systems before this were named Macintosh System Software through System Software 7.5, and known as System #.# for short.)	9.2.2	2000	Discontinued; Was bundled with 68k and PowerPC Macs; versions 7.1-9 sold as retail upgrades	Proprietary	Workstation, personal computer	Bundled
ChromeOS	Google	2011	none	150.0.7871.150	July 16, 2026	Bundled with hardware and updates at no cost given to most existing users, 32-bit edition dropped	Proprietary: Google OS Terms of Service. Open-source core system	Chromebook, Chromebox, Chromebase and tablet	Image, Bundled
ChromiumOS	Google	2009	none	Rolling release	July 16, 2026	No cost	BSD; Linux Kernel GPL-2.0-only	Personal computer	Image, Bundled
DragonFly BSD	Matthew Dillon	2003	FreeBSD	6.4.2	May 9, 2025	No cost	BSD	Server, workstation, NAS, embedded system	Image
eComStation	Serenity Systems, Mensys BV	2001	OS/2	2.1	May 20, 2011	Discontinued; Commercial	Proprietary	Server, workstation, personal computer	Image
EPOC32	Psion PLC	1996		ER5	1999	Discontinued; Commercial	Proprietary	PDA	Image
EulerOS/openEuler	Huawei	2021	Red Hat Enterprise Linux	25.09	September 2025	No cost	Open source	Server, workstation	Image
FreeBSD	The FreeBSD Project	1993	386BSD	15.1	June 16, 2026	No cost	BSD	Server, workstation, Desktop, NAS, embedded system	Image
Genode	Genode Labs	2008	None	26.05	29 May 2026	No cost	AGPL-3.0-only	Desktop, embedded system, server	Image
GhostBSD	Eric Turgeon	2009	FreeBSD	26.1-R15.0p2	April 18, 2026	No cost	BSD	Desktop, workstation	Image, Bundled
Googlebook OS	Google	2026	Android, ChromeOS	17	October 4, 2026	Bundled with hardware and updates at no cost given to most existing users	Proprietary: Google OS Terms of Service. Open-source core system	Googlebook, and tablet	Bundled
Haiku	Haiku Inc.	2002	BeOS R5	R1/Beta 5	September 13, 2024	No cost	MIT	Personal computer	Image, Bundled
HP NonStop	Tandem Computers, HP (now Hewlett Packard Enterprise)	1976	None	L25.09	September 2025	Bundled with hardware?	Proprietary	HP Nonstop Servers	Image, Bundled
HP-UX	HP (now Hewlett Packard Enterprise)	1983	UNIX System V	2505.11iv3	May 22, 2025	Discontinued; was US$400	Proprietary	Server	Image, Bundled
HarmonyOS	Huawei	2019	OpenHarmony, LiteOS	6.0.0 (7.0.0 (Developer Beta) / June 12, 2026)	November 25, 2025	Bundled with hardware and updates at no cost given to most existing users, subject to hardware requirements	Proprietary software except for open-source components	Internet of things, Smartphone, tablet computer, education, embedded system, smart watches	Image, Bundled
IBM i	IBM	1988	CPF, SSP	7.6	April 18, 2025	Bundled with hardware	Proprietary	Server	Image, Bundled
Inferno	Bell Labs	1996	Plan 9	Fourth Edition	June 30, 2009	No cost	MIT	NAS, server, embedded	Image, Bundled
iOS (originally iPhone OS)	Apple Inc.	2007	macOS	27.2	October 26, 2026	Bundled with hardware and updates at no cost given to most existing users, subject to hardware requirements	Proprietary higher level API layers; open source core system (ARM versions): APSL, GNU GPL, others	Smartphone, music player, tablet	Bundled
IRIX	SGI	1988	UNIX System V	6.5.30	2006	Discontinued; Bundled with hardware	Proprietary	Server, workstation	Image, Bundled
IX/370	IBM	1985	UNIX System V	Release 1.4?	September 25, 1987	Non-free	Proprietary	IBM System/370	Image, Bundled
Linux	Notable contributors include: Linus Torvalds for the Linux kernel; Red Hat, Debian Project See: Comparison of Linux distributions and Linux kernel#Development	1991 (kernel), See: Comparison of Linux distributions and History of Linux	None	7.3.5 (kernel)	17 November 2026 (kernel)	No cost	GPL-2.0-only (kernel)	See: Comparison of Linux distributions	Image, Bundled
macOS (originally Mac OS X)	Apple Inc.	2001	NeXTSTEP, BSD	27.2	October 26, 2026	Bundled with hardware; No cost for updates and upgrades via Mac App Store for users of Mac OS X 10.6 or later	Proprietary higher level API layers; open source core system (Apple Silicon-Intel-PowerPC versions): APSL, GNU GPL, others	Workstation, personal computer, embedded	Bundled
macOS Server (originally Mac OS X Server)	Apple Inc.	2001	NeXTSTEP, BSD	5.12	May 2, 2021	Discontinued; Previously bundled with hardware; No longer a separate operating system, but a group of services installed atop any version of macOS; US$19.99 on the Mac App Store	Proprietary higher level API layers; open source core system (Intel-PowerPC versions): APSL, GNU GPL, others	Server	Bundled
MCP	Unisys	1961	None	CP OS 21.0	June 2023	Bundled with hardware	Proprietary	Server	Bundled
MenuetOS	Ville Turjanmaa and others	2000	None	1.61.00	June 19, 2026	OS written in assembly language	Proprietary (free for personal and educational use); 32-bit (September 2, 2019) GPL	Workstation	Image, Bundled
MINIX 3	Andrew S. Tanenbaum	2005	Minix2	3.3.0	2014	No cost	BSD-3-Clause	Workstation	Image, Bundled
MPE	HP	1974	None	MPE-V	1988	Discontinued; Was bundled with HP-3000 CISC hardware "Classic"	Proprietary	Server	Image, Bundled
MPE/XL	HP	1987	MPE	7.5	2002	Discontinued; Was bundled with HP-3000 PA-RISC hardware	Proprietary	Server	Image, Bundled
MVS (OS/VS2 R2 through R3.8)	IBM	1972	OS/360 MVT, SVS	Release 3.8	1974	Free (discontinued)	Open source	IBM System/370	Bundled
MVS (MVS/SE through MVS/ESA)	IBM	1978 (March)	OS/VS2 R3.7 for MVS/SE R1; OS/VS2 R3.8 for MVS/SE R2 through MVS/ESA	MVS/ESA System Product Version 5.2.2 (V5R2.2)	Feb 28, 1995	Price tied to processor capacity	One Time Charge or monthly	S/370 S/370-XA S/370-ESA ESA/390	Image, Bundled
NetBSD	The NetBSD Project	1993	386BSD	10.1	December 16, 2024	No cost	BSD	NAS, server, workstation, embedded	Image, Bundled
NetWare	Novell	1983	S-Net	6.5 SP8	May 6, 2009	Superseded by Novell Open Enterprise Server; Was US$184 (equivalent to $276.13 in 2025) (one-user)	Proprietary	Server	Image, Bundled
NeXTSTEP	NeXT	1989	Unix	3.3	1995	Discontinued; Was bundled with hardware, then sold separately	Proprietary	Workstation	Image, Bundled
Oniro	Various (Eclipse Foundation, Huawei and others)	2021	None	6.0	October 7, 2025	No cost	Eclipse License, Apache-2.0	Internet of things, embedded system, smart watches, mobile devices, personal computers	Image, Bundled
OpenBSD	OpenBSD Project	1996	NetBSD 1.0	7.9	May 19, 2026	No cost	ISC	Server, NAS, workstation, embedded	Image, Bundled
OpenHarmony	Various (OpenAtom Foundation, Huawei and others)	2020	HarmonyOS, LiteOS	6.1	March 9, 2026	No cost	Apache-2.0	Internet of things, embedded system, smart watches, mobile devices, personal computers	Image, Bundled
OpenIndiana	Many, based on software developed by Sun Microsystems and many others	2010	OpenSolaris	Hipster 2026.04	May 5, 2026	No cost	CDDL	Server, workstation	Image, Bundled
OpenVMS	DEC (now VSI)	1977	RSX-11M	V9.2-3	November 20, 2024	Commercial, no cost for non-commercial use	Proprietary	Server, workstation	Image, Bundled
OS/2	IBM and Microsoft	1987	MS-DOS	4.52	2001	Discontinued (see ArcaOS successor); Was US$300 (equivalent to $545.48 in 2025)	Proprietary	Personal computer, server	Image, Bundled
OS/360	IBM	1966	None	Operating System/360 R21.8	August 1972	Free (discontinued)	Open source	S/360; S/370	Bundled
OS/390	IBM	1995	MVS/ESA	OS/390 version 2 R10	September 29, 2000	Price tied to processor capacity	One Time Charge or monthly	S/390	Image, Bundled
OS 2200	Unisys	1967 as Exec 8e	Exec 8, OS 1100	CP OS 20.0 (EXEC 50R1)	March 30, 2023	Bundled with hardware	Proprietary	Server	Bundled
OS/VS1	IBM	1972	OS/360 MFT II	Release 7.0?		Free (discontinued)	—N/a	IBM System/370	Image, Bundled
OS/VS2 SVS	IBM	1972	OS/360 MVT	Release 1.7		Free (discontinued)	—N/a	IBM System/370	Image, Bundled
Plan 9	Bell Labs	1992	Unix	Fourth Edition	2003 (except for minor later updates)	No cost	MIT	Workstation, server, embedded system, HPC	Image, Bundled
QNX	QNX Software Systems	1982	Unix, POSIX	7.1.0	July 2020	Bundled with BlackBerry 10 and PlayBook devices. Commercial; an academic version exists that needs authorization code before installing	Proprietary	Automotive, medical, smartphone, consumer, industrial, embedded system, safety	Bundled
ReactOS	ReactOS development team	1998	Windows NT (clone of)	0.4.15	March 21, 2025	No cost	GPL-2.0-or-later	Workstation, personal computer	Image, Bundled
Redox	Jeremy Soller	2015	-	0.9.0	September 9, 2022	No cost	MIT	Desktop, workstation, server	Image, Bundled
RISC iX	Acorn Computers	1988	BSD 4.3	1.21c	1993	Discontinued; Was bundled with hardware	Proprietary	Workstation	Image, Bundled
RISC OS	Acorn Computers	1987	Arthur	3.71	1997	Discontinued; Was bundled with hardware	Proprietary	Education, personal computer	Image, Bundled
RISC OS 4	RISCOS Ltd, Pace plc	1999	RISC OS	4.39	2004	Bundled with hardware, then sold separately at £70 (US$127)	Proprietary	Education, personal computer	Image, Bundled
RISC OS 5	Castle Technology, RISC OS Open	2002	RISC OS 4	5.30	April 27, 2024	No cost	Apache-2.0	Education, personal computer	Image, Bundled
RISC OS 6	RISCOS Ltd	2006	RISC OS 4	6.20	2009	Bundled with hardware, then sold separately at £70 (US$127)	Proprietary	Education, personal computer	Image, Bundled
Sailfish OS	Jolla Ltd.	2013		5.1	June 16, 2026	With Android App Support one time license fee of US$50	Source-available	Smartphone	Image, Bundled
SerenityOS	Andreas Kling	2018	None	Continuous integration		No cost	BSD-2-Clause	Workstation, personal computer	Image, Bundled
Solaris	Sun (now Oracle Corporation)	1992	SunOS	11.4 SRU92	April 21, 2026	Commercial; (a perpetual license at no cost when used "for the purpose of developing, testing, prototyping and demonstrating your applications")	CDDL	Server, workstation	Image, Bundled
STOP 6, XTS-400	BAE Systems	2003	STOP 5, XTS-300	8.2	August 2008	US$60,000 (equivalent to $89,722 in 2025)+; bundled with XTS hardware and OEM licensed	Proprietary	Server, workstation	Image, Bundled
Symbian	Symbian Ltd.	1998	EPOC32	9.5	2009	Discontinued; Commercial	Proprietary	Phone	Image, Bundled
Symbian platform	Symbian Foundation	2010 (initially 1998 as Symbian)	Symbian	3.0.4	2010	No cost	EPL	Embedded system	Image, Bundled
TempleOS	Terry Davis	2005 (as J Operating System)	None	5.03	November 20, 2017	No cost	Public domain	Personal computer	Image, Bundled
Tru64	Digital Equipment Corporation	1992 (January)	OSF/1	5.1B-6	October 1, 2010	Bundled with hardware	Proprietary	Server, workstation, HPC	Image, Bundled
VME	ICL	1974	None	SV294	1994	Bundled with hardware	Proprietary	ICL mainframe	Bundled
VSEⁿ	21st Century Software	1979 (as DOS/VSE)	DOS/360; DOS/VS	6.4	October 15, 2025	Monthly license fee	Proprietary	IBM Z	Image, Bundled
VxWorks	Wind River Systems	1987	VRTX	7	March 2014	Paid	Proprietary	Embedded real-time system	Image, Bundled
Windows	Microsoft	1985	None	Windows 11 (version 26H1 10.0.28000.2525)	July 14, 2026	One time license fee	Proprietary; Source-available	Workstation, personal computer, media center, Tablet PC, embedded system	Image, Bundled
Windows (classic 9x family)	Microsoft	1995	MS-DOS	Windows Me (Win 4.90.3000)	2000	Discontinued	Proprietary	Personal computer, media center	Image, Bundled
Windows (NT family)	Microsoft	1993	OS/2 and Windows 3.1x	Windows 11 (version 26H1 10.0.28000.2525)	July 14, 2026	One time license fee	Proprietary; Source-available	Workstation, personal computer, media center, Tablet PC, embedded system	Image, Bundled
Windows Server (NT family)	Microsoft	1993	OS/2	Windows Server 2025 (version 10.0.26100.33158)	July 14, 2026	US$1050 5 CALs server; other editions dependent on number of CALs purchased	Proprietary; Source-available	Server, NAS, embedded system	Image, Bundled
z/OS	IBM	2000	OS/390	Version 3.2 (V3R2)	September 30, 2025	Price tied to processor capacity	One Time Charge or monthly	IBM Z	Image, Bundled
z/VM	IBM	2000	VM/ESA	7.4	September 20, 2024	Monthly license fee	Proprietary	IBM Z	Image, Bundled
ZETA	yellowTAB	2005	BeOS R5	1.5	2007	Discontinued	Proprietary	Personal computer, media center, workstation	Image, Bundled
Name	Creator	Initial public release	Predecessor	Current stable version	Release date	Cost, availability	Preferred license	Target system type	Availability

== Technical information ==
Name	Computer architectures supported	File systems supported	Kernel type	Source lines of code	GUI default is on (Note: Operating systems where the GUI is not installed and turned on by default are often bundled with an implementation of the X Window System, installation of which is usually optional.)	Package management	Update management	Native APIs (Note: Most operating systems use proprietary APIs in addition to any supported standards.)	Non-native APIs supported through subsystems
AIX	POWER, PowerPC-AS, PowerPC, Power ISA	JFS, JFS2, ISO 9660, UDF, NFS, SMBFS, GPFS	Monolithic with modules		No	installp, RPM	Service Update Management Assistant (SUMA)	SysV/POSIX	
AmigaOS classic	68k, PowerPC	Proprietary (OFS, FFS, SFS, PFS), FAT, ISO 9660, UDF, many others via 3rd party drivers, such as SMBFS, etc.	Microkernel		Yes	Installer (Note: Amiga OS features since OS 2.0 version a standard centralized Install utility called Installer, which could be used by any software house to install programs. It works as a Lisp language interpreter, and install procedures could be listed as simple text. AmigaOS can also benefit from a 3rd party copyrighted library called XAD that is available for all POSIX (Unix, Linux, BSD, and for AmigaOS, MorphOS, etc.). This library is freely distributable and publicly available on Aminet Amiga centralized repository of all Open Source or Free programs and utilities. XAD.Library, complete with GUI Voodoo-X, is based on modules and capable to manage over 300 compression methods and package systems (Voodoo-X GUI supports 80 package systems), including those widely accepted as standards such as .ZIP, .CAB, .LHA, .LZX, .RPM, etc.) (almost not needed) (Note: A standard AmigaOS installation requires usually only few files (typically 3 to 10 files) to be copied in their appropriate directory, and libraries and language files for national localization to be put in their standard OS directories. Any Amiga user with some minimal experience knows where these files should be copied and could perform programs installations by hand.)		Proprietary	BSD subset (available through 3rd party ixemul.library)
AmigaOS 4	PowerPC	Proprietary (OFS, FFS, SFS, PFS), JXFS, FAT, ISO 9660, UDF, many others via 3rd party drivers, such as SMBFS, etc.	Microkernel		Yes	Installer (almost not needed)	AmiUpdate (almost not needed) (Note: AmiUpdate can update AmigaOS files and all Amiga programs which are registered to use the same update program that is standard for Amiga. Updating AmigaOS requires only few libraries to be put in standard OS location (for example all libraries are stored in Libs: standard virtual device and absolute path finder for Libs directory, Fonts are all in Fonts: absolute locator, the files for language localization are all stored in Locale: and so on). This leaves Amiga users with a minimal knowledge of the system almost free to perform by hand the update of the system files.)	Proprietary	BSD subset (available through 3rd party ixemul.library)
ArcaOS	IA-32	JFS (default), HPFS, ISO 9660, UDF, FAT32, NTFS	Hybrid		Yes	ANPM (based on WarpIN, YUM and RPM)	Update Facility	OS/2	POSIX, Win16, DOS, Win32, Java
ChromeOS	ARM, IA-32, x86-64	eCryptfs, NTFS, FAT, FAT16, FAT32, exFAT, ext2, ext3, ext4, HFS+, MTP (read and write), ISO9660 (read-only), UDF (read-only)	Monolithic with modules	≈17 million	Yes	Portage		Linux/POSIX	
DragonFly BSD	x86-64	UFS1, MFS, ext2, FAT (16/32), HAMMER, ISO 9660	Hybrid		No	dports, pkg	git, cvsup, rsync, pkg	BSD/POSIX	Mono, Java, Win16, (Note: using Wine) Win32, Linux
eComStation	IA-32	HPFS (default), FAT, JFS, UDF, FAT32, NTFS (read only)	Hybrid		Yes	WarpIN, Feature Install, others	Maintenance Tool	Proprietary, DOS API, Win16	POSIX, Java, others
FreeBSD	IA-32, x86-64, ARM, MIPS, PowerPC, others	UFS2, ZFS, ext2, ext3, ext4, FAT, ISO 9660, UDF, NFS, others	Monolithic with modules	6.25 million	No	Ports collection, packages	by source, network binary update (freebsdupdate)	BSD/POSIX	Mono, Java, Win16, Win32, Linux
Genode	ARM, RISC-V, IA-32, x86-64	ext2, ext3, FAT32, ISO9660	Microkernel or Monolithic kernel	≈300,000	No	Custom	None	Genode	POSIX, Qt, SDL, MirageOS
GhostBSD	IA-32, x86-64	UFS2, ext2, ext3, FAT, ISO 9660, UDF, NFS, ReiserFS (read only), XFS (experimental), ZFS, others	Monolithic with modules		Yes	Ports collection, packages	by source, network binary update (freebsdupdate)	BSD/POSIX	Mono, Java, Win16, Win32, Linux
Linux	IA-32, x86-64, ARM, PowerPC, SPARC, others	ext2, ext3, ext4, btrfs, F2FS, FAT, ISO 9660, UDF, NFS, and others	Monolithic with modules	≈15 million (kernel) lines of code for userland libraries and applications vary depending on the distribution	Yes	Depends on the distribution		Linux/POSIX	Mono, Java, Win16, Win32
Haiku	IA-32, PowerPC, x86-64	BFS (default), FAT, ISO 9660, ext3, NTFS	Hybrid	≈5.2 million	Yes	Ports collection (haikuport)	pkgman, HaikuDepot	POSIX, BeOS API	Java, Qt
HP-UX	PA-RISC, IA-64	VxFS, HFS, CDFS, EVFS, NFS, CIFS	Monolithic with modules		No	SD, swinstall	swa (HP-UX Software Assistant)	SysV/POSIX	
HarmonyOS	64-bit ARM, RISC-V, x86, x64 and LoongArch	HMDFS, EROFS, NFS, RAMFS, FAT, JFFS2, exFAT	Microkernel	≈239.6 million (100 Deterministic Latency Engine)	Yes	.app with HAP files	Software Update	Proprietary	Java until 3.0.0
Inferno	IA-32, PowerPC, SPARC, Alpha, MIPS, others	Styx/9P2000, kfs, FAT, ISO 9660	Monolithic with modules, user space file systems		Yes	?	?	Proprietary	
iOS	ARMv8-A (iOS 7–present), ARMv7-A (iPhone OS 3–iOS 10), ARMv6 (iPhone OS 1–iOS 4.2.1)	HFS+ (prior to version 10.3), APFS (since version 10.3)	Hybrid	≈80 million	Yes	?	Software Update	Cocoa, BSD-POSIX	?
Classic Mac OS	68k, PowerPC	HFS+, HFS, MFS (Mac OS 8.0 and before), AFP, ISO 9660, FAT(System 7 and later), UDF	Monolithic with modules		Yes	None	Software Update (only in Mac OS 9)	Toolbox, Carbon (from version 8.1)	
macOS	Apple silicon (11-present), x86-64 (10.4.7–26.7), IA-32 (10.4.4–10.6.8), PowerPC (10.0–10.5.8) (see also iOS for ARM)	HFS+ (default on hard drives, and on flash drives up to Sierra), APFS (default on flash drives in High Sierra), HFS, UFS, AFP, ISO 9660, FAT, UDF, NFS, SMBFS, NTFS (read only), FTP, WebDAV, ZFS (experimental)	Hybrid with modules	≈86 million	Yes	macOS Installer	Software Update	Carbon, Cocoa, Java, BSD-POSIX	Toolbox (only in versions up to Mac OS X 10.4, not supported on x86 architecture), Win16, Win32
MINIX 3	IA-32		Microkernel	≈12,000 (C) + ≈1,400 (Assembly)	No			POSIX	
NetBSD	IA-32, x86-64, ARM, MIPS, PowerPC, sparc64, others	UFS, UFS2, ext2, FAT, ISO 9660, NFS, LFS, and others	Monolithic with modules		No (Note: NetBSD and OpenBSD include the X Window System as base install sets, managed in their respective main source repository, including local modifications. Packages are also provided for more up-to-date versions which may be less tested.)	pkgsrc	by source or binary (using sysinst)	BSD-POSIX	Linux, others
NetWare	16-bit x86, IA-32	NSS, NWFS, FAT, NFS, AFP, UDF, CIFS, ISO 9660	Hybrid		Yes	NWCONFIG.NLM, RPM, X11-based GUI installer	binary updates, ZENWorks for Servers, Red Carpet	Proprietary	
OpenBSD	IA-32, x86-64, SPARC, 68k, Alpha, others	ffs, ext2, FAT, ISO 9660, NFS, some others	Monolithic		No	Ports collection, packages	by source or binary (packages via pkg_add)	BSD-POSIX	
OpenVMS	VAX, Alpha, IA-64, x86-64	Files-11 (ODS), ISO 9660, NFS, CIFS	Monolithic with modules		No	PCSI, VMSINSTAL	?	Proprietary	POSIX, RSX-11M
OS/2	16-bit x86 (1.x only), IA-32	HPFS, JFS, FAT, ISO 9660, UDF, NFS	Monolithic with modules		Yes	Feature Install and others	?	Proprietary, DOS API, Win16	Win32
OpenHarmony	64-bit ARM, RISC-V, x86, x64 and LoongArch	HMDFS, EROFS, NFS, RAMFS, FAT, JFFS2, exFAT	Multi-kernel	≈110 million+	Yes	.app with HAP files	Software Update	Open-source, ArkUI, OpenHarmony API Kits	Java until 3.0.0, React Native, Qt, Flutter, Electron, CEF
Oniro	64-bit ARM, RISC-V, x86, x64	HMDFS, EROFS, NFS, RAMFS, FAT, JFFS2, exFAT	Multi-kernel		Yes	.app with HAP files	Software Update	Open-source, ArkUI, OpenHarmony and Oniro API Kits, React Native for ArkUI	React Native, Qt, Flutter, Electron, CEF
Plan 9	IA-32, Alpha, MIPS, PowerPC, SPARC, others	fossil/venti, 9P2000, kfs, ext2, FAT, ISO 9660	Hybrid, user space file systems	≈2.5 million /sys/src (complete source of all supported architectures, kernels, commands and libraries)	Yes	None	replica	Proprietary (Unix-like)	POSIX compatibility layer
QNX	x86, SH-4, PowerPC, ARM, MIPS	QNX4FS, QNX6, ext2, FAT, ISO 9660, Joliet, NFS, CIFS, ETFS, UDF, HFS, HFS+, NTFS, others	Microkernel					POSIX, Java	
ReactOS	IA-32, PowerPC, ARM	FAT, BTRFS, and NTFS (read only)	Hybrid	nearly 8 million	Yes	ReactOS Applications Manager, MSI, custom installers	None	Win32, NT API	DOS API
Redox	x86-64	RedoxFS, TFS	Microkernel		Yes	pkgutils		POSIX	
RISC OS	ARM (both 26 and 32-bit addressing modes)	Acorn ADFS, Econet ANFS, FAT, ISO 9660, many others as loadable filesystems	Monolithic with modules. Cooperative multitasking with limited memory protection.		Yes	Applications self-contained; hardware drivers often in ROM	!IyoUpWtch	Huge number of SWI calls; extensive C libraries	
SerenityOS	x86, x86-64	ext2	Microkernel	≈750,000	Yes	None	None	POSIX, propertiary	
Solaris	IA-32, x86-64, SPARC	UFS, ZFS, ext2, FAT, ISO 9660, UDF, NFS, QFS, some others	Monolithic with modules		Yes	SysV packages (pkgadd); Image Packaging System (pkg) (Solaris 11 and later)	Image Packaging System (Solaris 11 and later)	SysV/POSIX, GTK, Java	Win16, Win32, Mono, Linux
OpenSolaris	IA-32, x86-64, SPARC(AI)	UFS, ZFS, ext2, FAT, ISO 9660, UDF, NFS, QFS, some others	Monolithic with modules	≈18.8 million	Yes	Image Packaging System (pkg), SysV packages (pkgadd)	Image Packaging System	SysV/POSIX, GTK, Java	Win16, Win32, Mono, Linux
STOP 6, XTS-400	x86	Proprietary	Monolithic		No	RPM for some untrusted applications	Binary updates via postal mail and proprietary tools	Some: SysV, POSIX, Linux, proprietary	
Symbian	ARM	FAT	Microkernel		Yes	SIS files	FOTA	Proprietary	POSIX compatibility layer
TrueOS	IA-32, x86-64 (Note: only i686 CPU)	UFS2, ext2, ext3, FAT, ISO 9660, UDF, NFS, ReiserFS (read only), XFS (experimental) and others	Monolithic with modules		Yes	Ports collection, packages, PBI Graphical Installers	by PBI updates, source, network binary update (freebsdupdate)	BSD-POSIX	Win16, Win32
Windows Server (NT family)	IA-32, x86-64, IA-64	NTFS, FAT, ISO 9660, UDF; 3rd-party drivers support ext2, ext3, ReiserFS, (Note: Windows can read and write with Ext2 and Ext3 file systems only when a driver from FS-driver or Ext2Fsd is installed. However, using Explore2fs, Windows can read from, but not write to, Ext2 and Ext3 file systems. Windows can also access ReiserFS through rfstool and related programs.) and HFS	Hybrid with modules	≈45 million	Yes	MSI, custom installers	Windows Update	Win32, NT API	DOS API, Win16 (only in 32-bit versions), POSIX, .NET
Windows (NT family)	IA-32, x86-64, ARM, IA-64, Alpha, MIPS, PowerPC	NTFS, FAT exFAT ISO 9660, UDF; 3rd-party drivers support btrfs, ext2, ext3, ReiserFS, HFS+, FATX, and HFS (with third party driver)	Hybrid with modules	≈40 (XP)/64 (Vista and later) million	Yes	MSI, custom installers	Windows Update	Win32, NT API	DOS API, Win16 (only in 32-bit versions), POSIX, .NET
ZETA	IA-32	BFS (default), FAT, ISO 9660, UDF, HFS, AFP, ext2, CIFS, NTFS (read only), ReiserFS (read only, up to v3.6)	Hybrid		Yes	SoftwareValet, script-based installers	None	POSIX, BeOS API	
z/OS	z/Architecture	VSAM, BDAM, QSAM, BPAM, HFS, zFS, etc.	Protected, multithreading, multitasking nucleus with programmable/user replaceable extensions. Not kernel-based.		No	None, SMP/E	SMP/E	Filesystem access methods, Systems Services, etc.	POSIX, many others.
Name	Computer architectures supported	File systems supported	Kernel type	Source lines of code	GUI default is on	Package management	Update management	Native APIs	Non-native APIs supported through subsystems

== Security ==
Name	Resource access control	Subsystem isolation mechanisms	Integrated firewall	Encrypted file systems	No execute (NX) page flag		Manufacturer acknowledged unpatched vulnerabilities (by severity) (Note: Comparison of known unpatched vulnerabilities based on Secunia & SecurityFocus reports with severity of Not critical & above. Update lists manually with oldest published date(s).)					
Name	Resource access control	Subsystem isolation mechanisms	Integrated firewall	Encrypted file systems	No execute (NX) page flag		Secunia					Security- Focus
Name	Resource access control	Subsystem isolation mechanisms	Integrated firewall	Encrypted file systems	Hardware	Emulation	Extremely critical (number / oldest)	Highly critical (number / oldest)	Moderately critical (number / oldest)	Less critical (number / oldest)	Not critical (number / oldest)	Total (number / oldest)
AIX 7.1	POSIX, ACLs, MAC, Trusted AIX - MLS, RBAC	chroot	IPFilter, IPsec VPNs, basic IDS	Yes	Yes (Note: AIX use the PowerPC architecture which offer page-level protection mechanism. Since AIX version 5300-03 (5.3), this feature can be activated using the sedmgr command.)	—N/a	Unknown					0
FreeBSD 10.1	POSIX, ACLs, MAC	chroot, Jails, MAC partitions, multilevel security, Biba Model, BSD file flags set using chflags, Capsicum Capability-based security	IPFW2, IPFilter, PF, IPsec	Yes	Yes	Yes (Note: The GCC stack protection (a.k.a. ProPolice stack-smashing protector) has been enabled in base system since FreeBSD 8.0-release.)	0	0	0	0	0	0
GhostBSD 3.1	POSIX, ACLs, MAC	chroot, jail, MAC partitions, BSD file flags set using chflags	IPFW2, IPFilter, PF	Yes	Yes	Yes	0	0	0	0	0	>0
Genode	Hierarchal, least privilege	capability-based security	Virtual switch and NAPT controls in user-space	No	kernel dependent	No	Unknown					
HP-UX 11.31	POSIX, ACLs	chroot	IPFilter	Yes	?	?	0	0	3 June 30, 2004; 22 years ago]	2 December 12, 2002; 23 years ago]	0	>0
Inferno	POSIX	Namespaces, capability-based security, no superuser or setuid bit	?	?	No	No	Unknown					>0
Linux-based 2.6.39	POSIX, ACLs, (Note: Support for the 1997 withdrawn POSIX ACL draft is included in Linux 2.6, but requires a file system able to store them (such as ext3, XFS or ReiserFS).) MAC	chroot, (Note: A jail mechanism is available separately in the Linux-VServer project, but is not integrated into any mainline Linux kernel.) seccomp, Namespaces, SELinux, AppArmor	Netfilter, varied by distribution	Yes	Yes	Yes	0	0	0	6 June 24, 2004; 22 years ago	11; April 4, 2005; 21 years ago	>0
Mac OS 9.2.2	No	No	No	No	No	No	0	0	0	0	0	>0
OS X 10.10.5	POSIX, ACLs (Note: ACLs were added to Mac OS X starting with version 10.4.)	chroot, BSD file flags set using chflags	ipfw	Yes	Yes (as of 10.5, X64 only)	Yes (Intel only)	0	0	1 April 14, 2009; 17 years ago	2 January 8, 2007; 19 years ago	5 November 22, 2006; 19 years ago	>0
NetBSD 6.1.2	POSIX, Veriexec, PaX, kauth	chroot, kauth, BSD file flags set using chflags	IPFilter, NPF, PF	Yes	Yes	No	Unknown					>0
NetWare 6.5 SP8	Directory-enabled ACLs	Protected address spaces	IPFLT.NLM	Yes	Yes	No	0	0	1 August 31, 2010; 16 years ago	2 October 30, 2003; 23 years ago	0	0
OES-Linux	Directory-enabled ACLs	chroot	IPFilter	Yes	Yes	No	Unknown					>0
OpenBSD 4.8	POSIX	chroot, systrace, BSD file flags set using chflags	PF	Yes	Yes	Yes	Unknown					>0
OpenVMS 9.2	ACLs, privileges	logical name tables	?	?	Yes	?	0	0	0	0	0	Unknown
OS/2, eComStation, ArcaOS	ACLs (Note: ACLs are available only in OS/2 Server versions with HPFS386 filesystem.)	No	IPFilter	No	?	?	0	0	0	0	0	0
TrueOS 8.1	POSIX, ACLs, MAC	chroot, jail, MAC partitions	IPFW2, IPFilter, PF	Yes (Note: Additionally swap space may be encrypted during installation, uses memory based tmp file storage by default.)	?	?	0	0	0	0	0	>0
Plan 9	POSIX ?	Namespaces, capability-based security, no superuser or setuid bit	ipmux	Yes	No	No	Unknown					>0
QNX 6.5.0	POSIX	?	PF, from NetBSD	?	?	?	0	0	0	5 November 20, 2002; 24 years ago	1 November 7, 2002; 24 years ago	Unknown
RISC OS	No	No	IPFilter	No	No	No	Unknown					
Solaris 10	POSIX, RBAC, ACLs, least privilege, Trusted Extensions	chroot, Containers, (Note: "Solaris Containers" (including "Zones") are a jail-type mechanism introduced with Solaris 10.) Logical Domains	IPFilter	Yes (Note: Through ZFS)	Yes	No	0	2 October 31, 2007; 19 years ago	5 October 23, 2007; 19 years ago	3 September 10, 2009; 17 years ago	2 November 6, 2006; 20 years ago	>0
OpenSolaris 2009.06	POSIX, RBAC, ACLs, least privilege, Trusted Extensions	chroot, Containers, Logical Domains	IPFilter	Yes	Yes	No	0	0	0	0	0	>0
Windows Server 2012	ACLs, privileges, RBAC	Win32 WindowStation, desktop, job objects	Windows Firewall	Yes	Yes	Yes	0	0	0	0	0	[Unknown]
Windows 8.1	ACLs, privileges, RBAC	Win32 WindowStation, desktop, job objects	Windows Firewall	Yes	Yes	Yes	0	0	0	0	1 May 30, 2014; 12 years ago	[Unknown]
ZETA	POSIX (Note: Zeta has full Unix file permissions, but the OS is single user, and users always run as superuser.)	No	No	No	No	No	Unknown					
STOP 6, XTS-400 (Note: STOP 6 is certified under Common Criteria at EAL5+.)	POSIX, multilevel security, Biba Model mandatory integrity, ACLs, privileges, subtype mechanism	Multilevel security, Biba Model, subtype mechanism	No	No	No	No	Unknown					
z/OS 1.11	RACF	RACF, low storage protection, page protection, storage protect key, execution key, subspace group facility, APF, ACR (alternate CPU recovery), more	z/OS IPSecurity	Optional	Yes (storage protect key, execution key, APF, more)	Yes	0 0	0	0	0	0	Unknown
Name	Resource access control	Subsystem isolation mechanisms	Integrated firewall	Encrypted file systems	Hardware	Emulation	Extremely critical (number / oldest)	Highly critical (number / oldest)	Moderately critical (number / oldest)	Less critical (number / oldest)	Not critical (number / oldest)	Total (number / oldest)
Name	Resource access control	Subsystem isolation mechanisms	Integrated firewall	Encrypted file systems	No execute (NX) page flag		Secunia					Security- Focus
Name	Resource access control	Subsystem isolation mechanisms	Integrated firewall	Encrypted file systems	No execute (NX) page flag		Known unpatched vulnerabilities (severity is accounted for)					

== Commands ==
For POSIX compliant (or partly compliant) systems like FreeBSD, Linux, macOS or Solaris, the basic commands are the same because they are standardized.

Feature	AROS	FreeBSD	Linux-based	HP-UX	OpenVMS	macOS	Solaris	Windows (cmd)	Windows (PowerShell)
List directory	list, dir	ls	ls	ls	dir	ls	ls	dir	Get-ChildItem
Clear console	clear	clear	clear	clear	ty/pa nl:	clear	clear	cls	Clear-Host
Copy file(s)	copy	cp	cp	cp	copy	cp	cp	copy	Copy-Item
Move file(s)	move	mv	mv	mv	ren	mv	mv	move	Move-Item
Rename file(s)	rename	mv	mv, rename	mv	ren	mv	mv	ren (rename)	Rename-Item
Delete file(s)	delete	rm	rm	rm	del	rm	rm	del (erase)	Remove-Item
Delete directory	delete	rmdir	rmdir	rmdir	del	rmdir	rmdir	rd (rmdir)	Remove-Item
Create directory	makedir	mkdir	mkdir	mkdir	create/dir	mkdir	mkdir	md (mkdir)	New-Item
Change current directory	cd (Note: May be omitted. Simply entering the directory name will change to it.)	cd	cd	cd	set def	cd	cd	cd (chdir)	Set-Location
Run shell script with new shell	shell file.shell	sh file.sh	sh file.sh	sh file.sh	@ file.com	sh file.sh	sh file.sh	cmd /c file.cmd	powershell file.ps1
Kill processes	?	kill, killall	killall, pkill, kill, skill	kill	stop	kill, killall	kill, pkill	taskkill	Stop-Process
Change process priority	changetaskpri	nice	nice, chrt	nice	set proc/prio	nice	nice	start /low, start /normal, start /high, start /realtime	Start-Process, wmic
Change I/O priority	?	(Note: This feature is still in development, see .)	ionice	?	set proc/prio	nice (Note: The nice command utilizes the setpriority() system call, which affects I/O priority, see OS X man page .)	?	?	?
Create file system	format	newfs	mkfs	newfs	init	mkfs	newfs, zpool / zfs create	format	Format-Volume
File system check and recovery	?	fsck	fsck	fsck	analyze/disk	fsck	fsck	chkdsk	Repair-Volume
Create software raid	?	atacontrol, gmirror, zfs create	mdadm -C	?	?	diskutil appleRAID	metainit, zpool create	diskpart (mirror only)	diskpart (mirror only)
Mount device	mount	mount	mount	mount	mount	mount, diskutil mount	mount	mountvol	New-PSDrive
Unmount device	assign drivename: dismount	umount	umount	umount	dismount	umount, diskutil unmount(disk)	umount	mountvol /d	Remove-PSDrive
Mount file as block device	?	mdconfig + mount	mount -o loop	?	?	hdid	lofiadm + mount	?	?
Show network configuration	?	ifconfig	ip addr, ifconfig	ifconfig, lanadmin	tcpip sh net (sh net)	ifconfig	ifconfig	ipconfig	Get-NetIPInterface, ipconfig
Show network route	?	netstat -r, route get, route monitor	ip route, route	netstat -r	tcpip sh route	netstat -r, route get, route monitor	netstat -r	route	Get-NetRoute
Trace network route	?	traceroute	traceroute	traceroute	tcptrace	traceroute	traceroute	tracert	Test-NetConnection
Trace network route with pings	?	traceroute -I	traceroute -I, mtr	?	tcptrace	traceroute -I	traceroute -I	pathping	pathping
Feature	AROS	FreeBSD	Linux-based	HP-UX	OpenVMS	macOS	Solaris	Windows (cmd)	Windows (PowerShell)

NOTE: Linux systems may vary by distribution which specific program, or even 'command' is called, via the POSIX alias function. For example, if you wanted to use the DOS dir to give you a directory listing with one detailed file listing per line you could use alias dir='ls -lahF' (e.g. in a session configuration file).

== See also ==
- Comparison of command shells
- Comparison of file systems
- List of operating systems
- List of security-focused operating systems
- List of custom Android distributions
- List of Linux distributions that run from RAM
- List of live CDs
- Timeline of operating systems
- Usage share of operating systems

=== Operating system comparisons ===
- Comparison of BSD operating systems
- Comparison of IPv6 support in operating systems
- Comparison of lightweight Linux distributions
- Comparison of Linux distributions
- Comparison of Microsoft Windows versions
- Comparison of mobile operating systems
- Comparison of MS-DOS compatible operating systems
- Comparison of netbook-oriented Linux distributions
- Comparison of open-source operating systems
- Comparison of OpenSolaris distributions
- Comparison of operating system kernels
- Comparison of real-time operating systems
- Comparison of Windows Vista and Windows XP
