= UFS2 =

UFS2 may refer to:

- Unix File System
- Universal Flash Storage v2.0
