= Half-open =

Half-open may refer to:

- Half-open file in chess
- Half-open vowel, a class of vowel sound

== Computing and mathematics ==
- Half-open interval, an interval containing only one of its endpoints
- Half-open line segment, a line segment containing only one of its endpoints
- TCP half-open, a TCP connection out of synchronization

== See also ==
- Half-closed
- Clopen
