= CHFS =

File system

- Developer(s): University of Szeged
- Full name: Chip File System
- Introduced: 2011 with NetBSD 6.0

Structures
- Directory contents: Red–black trees

Features
- File system permissions: POSIX

Other
- Supported operating systems: NetBSD

CHFS is a file system developed at the Department of Software Engineering, University of Szeged, Hungary. It was the first open source flash memory-specific file system written for the NetBSD operating system. Intended usage is over raw flash devices on embedded systems like ARM and MIPS, the filesystem is less suitable for use on consumer SSD (because consumer SSDs already make sure to not use the same physical blocks for writing modified data).

== Structure ==
Similar to UBIFS, the CHFS file system utilizes a separate layer for handling Flash aging and bad blocks, called EBH (erase block handler). The file system itself is modelled after JFFS2, thus the internal structure is very similar.

== ChewieFS ==
CHFS was originally called ChewieFS during development. The name was changed to avoid legal issues and to have a more neutral name.

== See also ==
- List of file systems
- NetBSD
- chfs AIX command line option for modifying filesystems
