= Tux3 =

Open-source file system

- Developer(s): Daniel Phillips, Ogawa Hirofumi
- Full name: Tux3
- Introduced: July 23, 2008; 16 years ago with Linux 2.6.x
- Partition IDs: 0x83 (MBR) Superblock magic: "tux3" {0x74, 0x75, 0x78, 0x33}

Structures
- Directory contents: B-tree
- File allocation: B-tree

Limits
- Max volume size: 2^60 bytes (1 EiB)
- Max file size: 2^60 bytes (1 EiB)
- Max no. of files: 2^48
- Max filename length: 255 bytes
- Allowed filename characters: All bytes except NUL and '/'

Features
- Dates recorded: Attribute modification (ctime), modification (mtime), access time (atime), version create
- Date range: 40 bits
- Date resolution: 1/256 second
- File system permissions: POSIX

Other
- Supported operating systems: Linux

Tux3 is an open-source versioning filesystem created by Daniel Phillips. He introduced the filesystem as a public replacement for his Tux2 filesystem which had encountered licensing issues due to the filing of several patents. Phillips had previously created the Htree directory indexing system which eventually became an official feature of ext3. The technical details of Tux3 were first publicized in an email on 23 July 2008.

== Design ==
In broad outline, Tux3 follows a conventional Unix-style inode/file/directory design. A Tux3 inode table is a B-tree with versioned attributes at the leaves. A file is an inode attribute that is a B-tree with versioned extents at the leaves. Directory indexes are mapped into directory file blocks as with Htree. Free space is mapped by a B-tree with extents at the leaves. It attempts to avoid traditional journaling by introducing a recovery logic which allows it to recover upon remounting.

A Tux3 inode is a variable sized object consisting of a list of attributes, each labeled by the version at which the attribute was added, changed or removed. The B-tree index by which inodes are referenced is not versioned. The B-tree index of a large file is also not versioned, except for the leaves of the index, which contain lists of extents, each labeled by the version at which the referenced file data was added or changed. This style of versioning is essentially the inverse of tree versioning methods used by Write Anywhere File Layout (WAFL), ZFS and Btrfs, where multiple tree roots of an entire filesystem are created in order to express differences between versions of the filesystem.

A claimed advantage of Tux3 style versioned entities is that only a few bytes need to be added to represent single changes to inode attributes or to index new versions of file data blocks, compared to some number of index blocks needing to be allocated and written for tree-versioned filesystems.

== Development history ==
As of August 2008, Tux3 was only capable of performing basic file I/O on files. By the end of 2008, Tux3 was capable of running within the kernel and able to sustain repeated runs of the file system exerciser fsx-linux, a big accomplishment.

On 17 February 2009, Linux booted from a Tux3 root filesystem for the first time.

On 18 January 2013, initial fsck support was added. So far it just checks physical referential integrity, but the developers are confident that they can make a fully functional e2fsck-quality fsck soon.

On 17 May 2014, Daniel Phillips made a plea to the kernel maintainer, to review the code and implement it into the kernel. The goal is to stabilize the code in the kernel and finally get stable.

On 9 October 2017, Daniel Phillips sent Tux3 update - Shardmap on the mailing list.

== See also ==
- Comparison of file systems
- Golden copy
- List of file systems
- PHTree
