= NPF (firewall) =

Packet filter software

- Original author(s): Mindaugas Rasiukevicius
- Initial release: October 17, 2012; 12 years ago
- Repository: github.com/rmind/npf
- Written in: C
- Operating system: NetBSD
- Type: packet filter, Firewall
- License: BSD license
- Website: www.netbsd.org/~rmind/npf/

NPF is a BSD licensed stateful packet filter, a central piece of software for firewalling. It is comparable to iptables, ipfw, ipfilter and PF. NPF is developed on NetBSD.

== History ==
NPF was primarily written by Mindaugas Rasiukevicius. NPF first appeared in the NetBSD 6.0 release in 2012.

== Features ==
NPF is designed for high performance on SMP systems and for easy extensibility. It supports various forms of Network Address Translation (NAT), stateful packet inspection, tree and hash tables for IP sets, bytecode (BPF or n-code) for custom filter rules and other features. NPF has extension framework for supporting custom modules. Features such as packet logging, traffic normalization, random blocking are provided as NPF extensions.

== Example of npf.conf ==
# Assigning IPv4-only addresses of the specified interfaces.
$ext_if = inet4(wm0)
$int_if = inet4(wm1)

# Efficient tables to store IP sets.
table <1> type hash file "/etc/npf_blacklist"
table <2> type tree dynamic

# Variables with the service names.
$services_tcp = { http, https, smtp, domain, 9022 }
$services_udp = { domain, ntp }
$localnet = { 10.1.1.0/24 }

# Different forms of NAT are supported.
map $ext_if dynamic 10.1.1.0/24 -> $ext_if
map $ext_if dynamic 10.1.1.2 port 22 <- $ext_if port 9022

# NPF has various extensions which are supported via custom procedures.
procedure "log" {
	log: npflog0
}

#
# Grouping is mandatory in NPF.
# There must be a default group.
#

group "external" on $ext_if {
	# Stateful passing of all outgoing traffic.
	pass stateful out final all

	block in final from <1>
	pass stateful in final family inet proto tcp to $ext_if port ssh apply "log"
	pass stateful in final proto tcp to $ext_if port $services_tcp
	pass stateful in final proto udp to $ext_if port $services_udp

	# Passive FTP and traceroute
	pass stateful in final proto tcp to $ext_if port 49151-65535
	pass stateful in final proto udp to $ext_if port 33434-33600
}

group "internal" on $int_if {
	# Ingress filtering as per RFC 2827.
	block in all
	pass in final from $localnet
	pass in final from <2>
	pass out final all
}

group default {
	pass final on lo0 all
	block all
}
