= Service Update Management Assistant =

The Service Update Management Assistant (SUMA) automates the update process for the AIX operating system by the retrieval of maintenance updates from IBM.

Without extensive configuration it is capable of automatically downloading, when available, entire maintenance levels and the latest security updates. It is also capable of comparisons against currently installed software, fix repositories and maintenance levels.

SUMA is capable of e-mail notification for currently available downloads.

== History ==
SUMA was introduced in AIX 5L Version 5.3.
