= Dirhash =

Dirhash is a feature of FreeBSD that improves the speed of finding files in a directory. Rather than finding a file in a directory using a linear search algorithm, FreeBSD uses a hash table. The feature is backwards-compatible because the hash table is built in memory when the directory is accessed, and it does not affect the on-disk format of the filesystem, in contrast to systems such as Htree. Free space for new entries is also tracked in-memory, allowing addition of new entries without having to scan the directory.

Dirhash was implemented by Ian Dowse early in 2001 as an addition to UFS, operating in parallel with higher-level file system caching. It was imported into FreeBSD in July 2001. It was subsequently imported into OpenBSD in December 2003 and NetBSD in January 2005.
