= Write Ahead Physical Block Logging =

Database transaction logging technique

Write Ahead Physical Block Logging (WAPBL) provides meta data journaling for file systems in conjunction with Fast File System (FFS) to accomplish rapid filesystem consistency after an unclean shutdown of the filesystem and better general use performance over regular FFS. With the journal, fsck is no longer required at system boot; instead, the system can replay the journal in order to correct any inconsistencies in the filesystem if the system has been shut down in an unclean fashion.

== History ==
WAPBL was initially committed into NetBSD in 2008, and first appeared with NetBSD 5.0 (2009).

With NetBSD 6.0 (2012), soft updates (known as soft dependencies in NetBSD) was removed in favour of WAPBL.

== See also ==
- Log-structured file system
- Soft updates
- Unix File System (UFS/FFS)
