= Comparison of operating system kernels =

A kernel is a component of a computer operating system. It serves as an intermediary connecting software to hardware, enabling them to work together seamlessly. A comparison of system kernels can provide insight into the design and architectural choices made by the developers of particular operating systems.

== Comparison criteria ==
The following tables compare general and technical information for a number of widely used and currently available operating system kernels. Please see the individual products' articles for further information.

Even though there are a large number and variety of available Linux distributions, all of these kernels are grouped under a single entry in these tables, due to the differences among them being of the patch level. See comparison of Linux distributions for a detailed comparison. Linux distributions that have highly modified kernels—for example, real-time computing kernels—should be listed separately. There are also a wide variety of minor BSD operating systems, many of which can be found at comparison of BSD operating systems.

The tables specifically do not include subjective viewpoints on the merits of each kernel or operating system.

== Feature overview ==
The major contemporary general-purpose kernels are shown in comparison. Only an overview of the technical features is detailed.

Kernel name	Programming language	Used in	Creator	Executable format (also see section below)	Type	Integrated firewall	SMP support	Multiple architecture support (also see section below).	Multitasking	Virtualization	Security	Profiling/Debugging	Soft real-time support	Hard real-time support	Can keep RTC in UT
Amiga Exec		AmigaOS	Commodore International	HUNK	Exokernel (atypical)	No	No	No	Yes	No	No	Yes	No	No	No
Amiga Exec SG (2nd Generation)		AmigaOS 4	Hyperion Entertainment	ELF/HUNK	Exokernel (atypical)	No	No	No	Yes	No	No	Yes	No	No	?
DragonFly BSD kernel	C	DragonFly BSD	Matt Dillon	ELF	hybrid	Ipfirewall, PF	Yes	No	Yes	chroot, jail, vkernel	Unix permissions	DDB, KGDB	?	?	?
FreeBSD kernel	C	FreeBSD, Debian GNU/kFreeBSD, Gentoo/FreeBSD, Orbis OS	The FreeBSD Project	ELF, others – platform dependent	monolithic	IPFilter, Ipfirewall, PF	Yes	Yes	Yes	chroot, jail, bhyve	Unix permissions, POSIX.1e and NFSv4 ACLs, Capsicum, TrustedBSD MAC, OpenBSM	KDB, DDB, KGDB, DTrace, hwpmc	Yes	?	Yes
GNU Hurd	C	GNU/Hurd (Arch Hurd, Debian GNU/Hurd)	GNU Project/Free Software Foundation	ELF	multiserver microkernel	No	Partial	No	Yes	chroot, Xen	Unix permissions, POSIX ACL, POSIX Capabilities	?	?	?	?
GNU Mach	C	part of GNU Hurd, used in GNU/Hurd	GNU Project/Free Software Foundation	ELF	microkernel	No	Partial	No	Yes	No	No	?	?	?	?
Inferno kernel		Inferno	Bell Labs / Vita Nuova Holdings	?	virtual machine	?	Yes	Yes	Yes	chroot, Xen	?	?	?	?	?
L4		L4	Jochen Liedtke	None	microkernel	No	Yes	Yes	Yes	Yes	Afterburner/L4 , Marzipan , capabilities in L4/Fiasco	L4/Fiasco	L4/Fiasco	?	?
Linux kernel	C	Linux (kernel), Android, Ubuntu, CentOS, webOS, Fire OS, Firefox OS, ChromeOS, Syllable Server, Mastodon Linux, OpenBSD/Linux, Plan 9/Linux, Sailfish OS, Tizen, amongst others.	Linus Torvalds	ELF, others	monolithic	Ipfirewall (1.1 –); ipchains (2.2 –); Netfilter (2.4 –); nftables (3.13 –); XDP (4.8 –)	Yes	Yes	Yes	cgroups, chroot, Lguest, Xen, KVM, kvm-lite, LXC	Unix permissions, POSIX ACL, POSIX Capabilities, keyctl, LSM (SELinux, SMACK, TOMOYO Linux, AppArmor)	OProfile, kprobe, SystemTap, JProbe, ftrace, KDB, KGDB, kernel marker, perf tools, eBPF	preempt=full, threadirqs	PREEMPT RT, CPU task isolation	Yes
Compute Node Linux		Compute Node Linux	Cray Inc.	?	?	?	?	?	?	?	?	?	?	?	?
Mach	C	NeXTSTEP and OPENSTEP for Mach, Tru64 UNIX and MkLinux	Carnegie Mellon University	Mach-O	microkernel, hybrid kernel	?	Yes	?	Yes	?	?	?	Yes	?	?
MINIX 3 kernel	C	MINIX 3	Andrew S. Tanenbaum	ELF, a.out	microkernel	No	No	Yes	Yes	No	Unix permissions	Call profiling, statistical profiling, Minix Debugger (mdb)	No	No	?
NetBSD kernel	C	NetBSD, GNU/kNetBSD (Debian GNU/NetBSD),	The NetBSD Project	ELF, others – platform dependent	monolithic, anykernel using rump kernel architecture	IPFilter, PF, NPF	Yes	Yes	Yes	Xen, chroot	kauth, Unix permissions	DDB, KGDB, tprof	POSIX real-time scheduling extensions	Kernel preemption	Yes
NetWare kernel		NetWare	Novell	NLM	hybrid	Yes	Yes	No	Yes	?	?	?	?	?	?
OpenBSD kernel	C	OpenBSD	OpenBSD developers	ELF, others – platform dependent	monolithic	PF	Yes	Yes	Yes	?	Unix permissions	?	?	?	?
OS/2 kernel		OS/2 version 2 and above	IBM	LX	hybrid	No	Yes	No PowerPC version developed but never officially released.	Yes	No	Yes	Yes	Yes	No	?
Plan 9 kernel	C	Plan 9 from Bell Labs	Bell Labs	?	monolithic	ipmux	Yes	Yes	Yes	?	?	?	?	?	?
ReactOS kernel	C	ReactOS	ReactOS Foundation	PE	hybrid	?	Yes	Yes	Yes	?	Yes	Yes	?	?	?
Rockbox kernel		Rockbox	The Rockbox Project	?	?	?	?	Yes	?	?	?	?	?	?	?
SunOS kernel	C	SunOS	Sun Microsystems	a.out	monolithic	?	Yes	Yes	Yes	?	Unix permissions	?	?	?	?
Solaris kernel	C	Solaris, OpenSolaris, GNU/kOpenSolaris (Nexenta OS)	Sun Microsystems	ELF (32-bit only until Solaris 7 in 1998)	monolithic	IPFilter, PF (since Oracle Solaris 11.3)	Yes	Yes	Yes	Zones, chroot	Unix permissions, ACL, RBAC, Auditing, Privileges, Zones, Trusted Extensions	DTrace, CPU profiling, microstate accounting, perf counters, kernel lock stats, kstats, mdb, kmdb	Real-time scheduler	?	Yes
SVR5 kernel	C	UnixWare 7, OpenServer 6	Santa Cruz Operation	ELF	monolithic	IPFilter	Yes	No	Yes	No	Unix permissions	?	?	?	Yes
Trix kernel		Trix	Massachusetts Institute of Technology	a.out	monolithic	?	Yes	No	Yes	?	?	?	?	?	?
VMkernel	C	VMware ESXi	VMware	ELF	monolithic	Yes	Yes	Yes	Yes	Yes	Unix permissions	Built-in debugger	?	?	Yes
Windows NT kernel	C	All Windows NT family systems, 2000, XP, 2003, Vista, Windows 7, Windows 8, Windows Phone 8, Windows Phone 8.1, Windows 10, Windows 11, Windows Server	Microsoft	PE	hybrid	Yes	Yes	Yes	Yes	Hyper-V	ACL, Privileges	Event Tracing, dgbss, kd	Multimedia Class Scheduler Service	No	Unofficial
Windows 9x kernel	C++	Windows 95, Windows 98, Windows Me	Microsoft	PE	monolithic										
XNU (Darwin kernel)	C, C++	macOS, iOS, iPadOS, tvOS, watchOS,OpenDarwin,PureDarwin,GNU/Darwin	Apple Inc.	Mach-O	hybrid	Ipfirewall, PF (starting in Lion)	Yes	Yes	Yes	chroot	Unix permissions, NT/NFSv4 ACLs, TrustedBSD MAC, OpenBSM	KDB, DDB, DTrace	Yes	No	Yes
SPARTAN kernel	C	HelenOS	Jakub Jermar	ELF	microkernel	?	Yes	Yes	Yes	?	?	?	?	?	?
Zircon	C++	Fuchsia OS	Google	ELF	microkernel	No	Yes	Yes	Yes	Lguest, Xen, KVM, kvm-lite	Yes	KDB, DDB, GDB	Yes	No	Yes

== Failure analysis and availability ==
Kernel Name	Kernel Log	Serious system error report	Fatal system error report	Kernel crash dump	Kernel debugger	Hardware error detection	Software RAID	Remote storage replication	CPU hotplug	Memory hotplug	Kernel live patching	Kernel live update
DragonFly BSD kernel	Yes	?	Kernel panic	?	ddb	?	?	?	?	?	?	?
FreeBSD kernel	kern.msgbuf in sysctl	?	Kernel panic	Yes (Note: Can be debugged using kgdb(1))	ddb	?	GEOM, ZFS	(HAST in user-space)	No	?	?	?
Linux kernel	kmsg	Linux kernel oops	Kernel panic / drm_panic	kdump (Note: Can be debugged using crash(8))	KDB / KGDB	EDAC (formerly Bluesmoke)	md, LVM	DRBD	Yes	Yes	livepatch	Kexec HandOver / Live Update Orchestrator
NetBSD kernel	Yes	?	Kernel panic	?	DDB / KGDB	?	RAIDframe, ZFS	?	?	?	?	?
OpenBSD kernel	Yes	?	Kernel panic	Yes	ddb	?	softraid	?	?	?	?	?
Solaris kernel	Yes	?	Yes	System core dump (Note: Can be debugged using mdb(1))	mdb	ereport	Solaris Volume Manager, ZFS	?	?	?	?	?
Windows NT kernel	NT Kernel Logger in ETW		Stop Error (Blue Screen of Death)	Kernel-mode Dump	KD	WHEA	Storage Spaces / Disk Management	Storage Replica / DFS Replication	Dynamic Hardware Partitioning		Hotpatch	?
XNU	Yes	?	Kernel panic	?	ddb / kdp	?	AppleRAID	?	?	?	?	?
Zircon	?	?	?	?	?	?	?	?	?	?	?	?

== Scalability and clustering ==
Kernel Name	Supported number of CPU cores	NUMA support	Computer cluster interconnect					Application checkpointing / Process migration	Single system image	Clustered file system
Kernel Name	Supported number of CPU cores	NUMA support	Remote direct memory access (RDMA) support	InfiniBand support	RDMA over Thunderbolt support	PCI Express Non-Transparent Bridge (NTB) support	CXL 3.1 inter-host communication with GIM support	Application checkpointing / Process migration	Single system image	Clustered file system
DragonFly BSD kernel	256	Partial	?	?	?	?	?	sys_checkpoint	planned	HAMMER2
FreeBSD kernel	1024	Yes	Yes	Yes	?	Yes	?	?	No	pNFS
Linux kernel	8192	Yes	Yes	Yes	(thunderbolt-ibverbs)	Yes	No	Checkpoint/Restart	(openMosix / OpenSSI / Kerrighed / MattX)	pNFS / Ceph / OCFS2 / GFS2
Solaris kernel	512	Yes	Yes	Yes	?	?	?	No	No	PxFS
Windows NT kernel	?	Yes	?	?	?	?	?	?	No	Cluster Shared Volumes
XNU	?	?	Yes	?	Yes	?	?	?	?	Xsan

== Realtime support ==
Kernel Name	Full kernel preemption			Prevent priority inversion (Priority inheritance)		Realtime Scheduling	Realtime Priority	Realtime I/O	CPU Isolation	Disable CPU's Interrupt request (IRQ) handling	Disable CPU's timer ticks	Prevent memory from being swapped out	Cache coloring
Kernel Name	kernel threads	interrupt handlers	lock sections	kernel space	userland	Realtime Scheduling	Realtime Priority	Realtime I/O	CPU Isolation	Disable CPU's Interrupt request (IRQ) handling	Disable CPU's timer ticks	Prevent memory from being swapped out	Cache coloring
DragonFly BSD kernel	?	?	?	?	?	?	?	?	?	?	?	mlock/mlockall system call	?
FreeBSD kernel	FULL_PREEMPTION (only for debugging)		No	?	UMUTEX_PRIO_INHERIT on _umtx_op	SCHED_FIFO / SCHED_RR on ULE scheduler	rtprio system call	?	?	?	Yes, since FreeBSD 9.0	mlock/mlockall system call	Yes
Linux kernel	preempt=full	threadirqs	PREEMPT_RT	RT-mutex / (mutex with Proxy Execution)	PI-futexes / (FUTEX_PING)	SCHED_FIFO / SCHED_RR on CFS/EEVDF	rtprio system call	IOPRIO_CLASS_RT	isolcpus	irqaffinity	nohz_full	mlock/mlockall system call	No
NetBSD kernel	?	?	?	?	?	?	?	?	?	?	?	mlock/mlockall system call	Yes
OpenBSD kernel	?	?	?	?	?	?	?	?	?	?	?	mlock/mlockall system call	?
Solaris kernel	Yes	?	?	?	Yes	?	?	?	?	?	?	mlock/mlockall system call	Yes
Windows NT kernel	Yes	?	?	?	AutoBoost	REALTIME_PRIORITY_CLASS	?	?	?	?	Windows 8 and later	VirtualLock	?
XNU	?	?	?	?	os_unfair_lock	?	?	?	?	?	?	mlock system call	?
Zircon	?	?	?	?	?	?	?	?	?	?	?	?	?

== Transport protocol support ==
Kernel Name	Internet layer (L3)			Transport layer (L4)							L4S Congestion controls		
Kernel Name	IPv4	IPv6	IPSec	TCP	Multipath TCP	UDP	UDP-Lite	SCTP	DCCP	QUIC	Accurate ECN (AccECN)	TCP Prague	Dual-Queue Coupled Active Queue Management
DragonFly BSD kernel	Yes	Yes	?	Yes	?	Yes	No	No	No	?	?	?	?
FreeBSD kernel	Yes	Yes	Yes	Yes	Unofficial patch exists	Yes	Yes	Yes	Unofficial patches exist	?	?	?	?
Linux kernel	Yes	Yes	Yes	Yes	Partial	Yes	dropped in 7.1	Yes	dropped in 6.16	Unofficial	Yes	(Linux kernel tree with L4S patches)	DualPI2 qdisc
NetBSD kernel	Yes	Yes	Yes	Yes	?	Yes	?	Yes	Yes	?	?	?	?
OpenBSD kernel	Yes	Yes	?	Yes	?	Yes	No	No	No	?	?	?	?
Solaris kernel	Yes	Yes	Yes	Yes	?	Yes	No	Yes	No	?	?	?	?
Windows NT kernel	Yes	Yes	Yes	Yes	?	Yes	?	No	?	?	?	?	?
XNU	Yes	Yes	?	Yes	Yes	Yes	No	No	No	?	?	?	?
Zircon	?	?	?	Yes	?	Yes	?	Yes	Yes	?	?	?	?

=== Data link layer and Tunneling protocol support ===
Kernel Name	Data link layer (L2)		L2 over L2	L2 segmentation		layer 2.5 (L2.5)	L2 over L2.5	L2 over L3		L3 over L3				L2 over L4		
Kernel Name	PPP	Ethernet	PPPoE	IEEE 802.1Q (VLAN)	IEEE 802.1ad (QinQ)	MPLS	VLL Epipe (VPWS)	L2TPv3	L2 GRE	L3 GRE	Mobile IP Minimal Tunneling	IP in IP (IPIP)	6in4 (SIT)	PPTP	L2TP	VXLAN
DragonFly BSD kernel	Yes	Yes	?	Yes	?	?	?	?	?	Yes		gif		?	?	?
FreeBSD kernel	Legacy kernel PPP (Note: Dropped since FreeBSD 8.0-RELEASE) and netgraph-based kernel PPP	Yes	Yes	Yes	?	?	?	?	?	Yes	Yes	gif		?	?	Yes
Linux kernel	Yes	Yes	Yes	Yes		Yes	?	Yes	?	Yes	No	Yes	Yes	No (Note: Implemented in user-space only)	Yes	Yes
NetBSD kernel	Yes	Yes	Yes	Yes	?	Yes	?	l2tp interface	?	Yes		gif		?	?	?
OpenBSD kernel	Yes	Yes	Yes	Yes	svlan	?	mpw	?	egre	Yes	No	?	gif	?	?	Yes
Solaris kernel	Yes	Yes	Yes	Yes	?	?	?	?	?	?	No	Yes	?	No	No	Yes
Windows NT kernel	?	Yes	raspppoe.sys	?	?	?	?	?	?	Yes	No	ipinip.sys	No	raspptp.sys	rasl2tp.sys	Yes
XNU	Yes	Yes	?	Yes	?	?	?	?	?	?	No	gif		?	?	?
Zircon	?	?	?	?	?	?	?	?	?	?	?	?	?	?	?	?

== Inter-process communication support ==
Kernel Name	Signal	Messaging		Shared memory		Stream-oriented				Kernel-assisted Remote Procedure Call
Kernel Name	Signal	Message queue (Mailbox)	Between kernel and userspace	Anonymous	Named	Pipe		Local socket	Pseudo terminal	Kernel-assisted Remote Procedure Call
Kernel Name	Signal	Message queue (Mailbox)	Between kernel and userspace	Anonymous	Named	Anonymous pipe	Named pipe	Local socket	Pseudo terminal	Kernel-assisted Remote Procedure Call
FreeBSD kernel	Yes	POSIX/System V	AF_ROUTE and AF_NETLINK sockets	SHM_ANON	Yes	Bidirectional	Yes	AF_UNIX	posix_openpt, and UNIX 98 and BSD-style compatibility module	?
XNU	Yes	POSIX	AF_ROUTE and AF_SYSTEM sockets, Mach IPC	?	Yes	Unidirectional	Yes	AF_UNIX	UNIX 98 and BSD	Mach IPC
DragonFly BSD kernel	Yes	?	?	?	Yes	Bidirectional	Yes	AF_UNIX	UNIX 98 and BSD	?
NetBSD kernel	Yes	?	AF_ROUTE sockets	?	Yes	Unidirectional	Yes	AF_UNIX	UNIX 98, BSD and OpenBSD (ptm)	?
OpenBSD kernel	Yes	?	AF_ROUTE sockets	?	Yes	Bidirectional	Yes	AF_UNIX	BSD and OpenBSD (ptm)	?
Linux	Yes	POSIX/System V	AF_NETLINK sockets	memfd	POSIX/System V	Unidirectional	Yes	AF_UNIX	UNIX 98 and BSD	Binder
Solaris kernel	Yes	POSIX/System V	?	?	Yes	Bidirectional	Yes	AF_UNIX	UNIX 98 and BSD	Doors
Windows NT kernel	?	MailSlot	?	?	Yes	Unidirectional	NPFS	AF_UNIX	No	ALPC

== In-kernel security ==
Kernel	File access control	Disable memory execution support	Kernel ASLR	Mandatory access control	Capability-based security	In-kernel key management	Audit API	Sandbox	SYN flood protection	UDP flood protection	Ping flood protection	Smurf attack protection	Network behavior analysis
Linux	Traditional Unix permissions, POSIX ACL	Yes	Yes	LSM (SELinux, SMACK, TOMOYO Linux, AppArmor)	Yes	keyctl	fanotify / inotify	SELinux Sandbox, seccomp	SYN cookies	hashlimit module / intermediate lockless queues	ICMP rate limiting	reverse path filtering	Netfilter
FreeBSD kernel	Traditional Unix permissions, POSIX and NFSv4 ACL	Yes	Yes	TrustedBSD MAC	In-kernel privilege division, and Capsicum	?	OpenBSM / inotify	Capsicum, MAC framework	SYN cookies	?	ICMP rate limiting	?	?
Solaris kernel	Traditional Unix permissions, POSIX ACL, NFSv4 ACL	Default	?	Solaris Trusted Extensions	Process privileges	?	?	?	?	?	?	?	?
Windows NT kernel	Access control list	DEP	Yes	Mandatory Integrity Control	Process security tokens, and AppContainers	No	Yes	Windows Event Log	Yes	Yes	?	?	?
XNU	Traditional Unix permissions, NT/NFSv4 ACL	Yes	Yes	TrustedBSD MAC	?	?	OpenBSM	Apple XNU Sandbox	?	?	?	?	?

Kernel	Code signing			Prevent BYOVD attack	Runtime integrity checking	Application Whitelisting	Verifying	
Kernel	Kernel (Secure Boot)	Kernel driver	Application	Prevent BYOVD attack	Runtime integrity checking	Application Whitelisting	block device	filesystem
Linux	Yes	Module signature verification	IMA / EVM	?	(Linux Kernel Runtime Guard)	?	dm-verity	fs-verity
FreeBSD kernel	?	?	?	?	?	?	?	?
NetBSD kernel	?	?	?	?	?	veriexec	?	?
Solaris kernel	?	?	?	?	?	?	?	?
Windows NT kernel	Yes	Kernel-Mode Code Signing	?	Vulnerable Driver Blocklist	PatchGuard (Note: a.k.a. Kernel Patch Protection), HyperGuard (Note: a.k.a. Secure Kernel PatchGuard)	AppLocker	?	Windows Resource Protection
XNU	?	kext signing	?	?	Kernel Patch Protection	?	?	?

== In-kernel virtualization ==
Kernel Name	Container (no resource management, no security)	Container (no resource management)	Container (resource management)	Paravirtualization	Full virtualization	User-space execution	Kernel as Library	Cooperative kernel execution	Hypervisor-Enforced Kernel Partitioning
Linux	chroot	LXC		Virtio, Hyper-V (guest only), Xen (guest only), VMI (guest only), kvm-lite, lguest	KVM	UML	(LKL)	(coLinux/MoCoLinux)	No
DragonFly BSD kernel	chroot	jail		No	No	vkernel	?	?	No
FreeBSD kernel	chroot	jail		Virtio, Xen	bhyve	?	?	?	No
NetBSD kernel	chroot	(sysjail (discontinued))	No	Virtio, Xen	No	?	Rump kernel	?	No
OpenBSD kernel	chroot	No	No	Xen (guest only)	Yes	No	No	No	No
Solaris kernel	chroot	Solaris Containers / Zones		No	No	No	?	?	No
Windows NT kernel	AppContainers, Job Objects, Windows Server Containers			Hyper-V		Project Drawbridge		No	Virtual Secure Mode, Device Guard, Credential Guard
XNU	chroot	?	?	?	Yes	?	?	?	No

== In-kernel server support ==
Kernel Name	HTTP	FTP	NFS	CIFS	Name server	Transport-layer load balancer	Application-layer load balancer	9P	TLS proxy	WAF	Memcached server
Linux kernel	(TUX web server patch)	(TUX web server patch)	knfsd	ksmbd	?	IP Virtual Server	(KTCPVS)	(patch available)	SOL_TLS	(Tempesta FW)	(kmemcached)
DragonFly BSD kernel	No	No	Up to NFS v3	Yes	?	Yes	?	No	No	?	?
FreeBSD kernel	No	No	Yes	No	No	Yes	No	No	ktls	?	?
Solaris kernel	?	?	Yes	Yes	?	Yes	Yes	?	KSSL	?	?
Windows NT kernel	HTTP.sys	?	?	Yes	?	Yes	Yes	No	?	?	?
XNU	No	No	Yes	No	No	No	No	No	No	?	?

== Binary format support ==
A comparison of OS kernel support for different binary formats (executables):

Name	a.out	ECOFF	ELF	FDPIC ELF binaries (mmu less)	flat binaries (superH)	HUNK	Mach-O	Misc (wrapper based, like interpreters)	PE	SOM (PA-RISC, HP-UX)	NLM	PEF	DOS COM	MZ	LE	LX	NE
Amiga Exec	No	No	Yes	No	No	Yes	No	No	No	No	?	?	?	?	?	?	?
DragonFly BSD kernel	No	No	Yes	No	No	No	No	No	No	No	No	No	No	No	No	No	No
FreeBSD kernel	Yes	No	Yes	No	No	No	No	Yes	No	No	No	No	No	No	No	No	No
HP-UX kernel	No	No	Yes	No	No	No	No	No	No	Yes	No	No	?	?	?	?	?
Linux	Dropped	Yes	Yes	Yes	Yes	No	No	Yes	No	Yes	?	No	?	?	?	?	?
MINIX 3	Some	No	Yes	No	No	No	No	No	No	No	No	No	?	?	?	?	?
NetBSD kernel	Yes	Yes	Yes	?	?	?	Dropped	?	Yes	?	?	?	?	?	?	?	?
OpenBSD kernel	?	?	Yes	?	?	?	?	?	?	?	?	?	?	?	?	?	?
ReactOS kernel	?	?	?	?	?	?	?	?	Yes	?	?	?	?	?	?	?	?
Solaris kernel	Yes	No	Yes	No	No	No	No	No	No	No	?	?	?	?	?	?	?
Windows NT kernel	No	No	Yes with WSL	No	No	No	No	No	Yes	No	No	No	No (Note: Supported by Win32 subsystem in user-space on x86)	No	?	?	No
XNU	No	No	No	No	No	No	Yes	No	No	No	No	No	No	No	No	No	No

== File system support ==
Physical file systems:

Kernel	Acorn ADFS	Amiga FFS	APFS	BeFS	BFS	cramfs	EFS	ext2	ext3	ext4	F2FS	FAT	FreeVxFS	HFS	HFS+	HPFS	ISO 9660	JFFS	JFFS2	JFS	MINIX fs	NSS	NTFS	OCFS	QNX4 FS	System V FS	UDF	UFS	XFS	ZFS	ReiserFS	Reiser4	Btrfs	HAMMER	Tux3	exFAT	ReFS
DragonFly BSD kernel	No	No	No	No	No	No	No	Yes	No	No	No	Yes	No	No	No	No	Yes	No	No	No	No	No	limited write	No	No	No	read only	Yes	No	No	No	No	No	Yes	No	No	No
FreeBSD kernel	No	No	No	No	No	No	No	Yes	Yes	Yes	No	Yes	No	No	No	No	Yes	No	No	No	No	No	Support dropped since 10.0-RELEASE	No	No	No	Yes	Yes	read only	Yes	read only	No	No	No	No	?	No
Linux kernel	Yes	Yes	Unofficial	read only	Yes	Yes	read only	Yes	Yes	Yes	Yes	Yes	read only	Yes	limited write (only with empty journal)	Yes	Yes	Yes	Yes	Yes	Yes	Yes	Full read/write support since 5.15	Yes	Yes	write support?	Yes	Yes	Yes	3rd-party module	Yes	Yes	Yes	No	Yes	Yes	No
MINIX 3 kernel	No	No	No	No	No	No	No	Yes	No	No	No	Tools available, cannot mount	No	No	No	No	Yes	No	No	No	Yes	No	No	No	No	No	No	No	No	No	No	No	No	No	No	No	No
NetBSD kernel	?	?	?	?	?	?	?	?	?	?	?	?	?	?	?	?	?	?	?	?	?	?	?	?	?	?	?	Yes	?	Yes	?	?	?	?	?	?	?
NetWare kernel	No	No	No	No	No	No	No	No	No	No	No	Yes	No	No	No	No	Yes	No	No	No	No	Yes	No	No	No	No	Yes	No	No	No	No	No	No	No	No	?	No
OpenBSD kernel	No	No	No	No	No	No	No	Yes	No	No	No	Yes	No	No	No	No	Yes	No	No	No	No	No	Read only	No	No	No	Read only	Yes	No	No	No	No	No	No	No	No	No
ReactOS kernel	No	No	No	No	No	No	No	Yes	Yes	Yes	No	Yes	No	No	No	No	Yes	No	No	No	No	No	Read only	No	No	No	Yes	No	No	No	No	No	Yes	No	No	No	No
Solaris kernel	?	?	No	?	?	?	?	Yes	?	?	?	Yes	?	?	?	?	Yes	?	?	?	?	No	No	?	?	?	Yes	Yes	?	Yes	No	No	No	No	No	?	No
Windows NT kernel	?	?	Unofficial	?	?	?	?	Unofficial	Unofficial	Unofficial	No	Yes	?	Unofficial	Unofficial	No	Yes	?	?	?	?	No	Yes	?	?	?	Yes	?	?	No	No	No	Unofficial	No	No	Yes	Yes
XNU	No	No	Yes	No	No	No	No	Unofficial	Unofficial	No	No	Yes	No	Yes	Yes	No	Yes	No	No	No	No	No	Read only	No	No	No	Yes	Yes	No	Official support was abandoned; 3rd-party modules available	No	No	No	No	No	Yes	No

== Networked file system support ==
Kernel Name	NFS	AFS	CIFS	Coda	9P	Ceph
DragonFly BSD kernel	Up to NFSv3	No	Yes	No	No	No
FreeBSD kernel	Yes	Yes	Yes	Yes	No	Yes
Linux kernel	Yes	Yes	Yes	Yes	Yes	Yes
NetBSD kernel	Up to NFSv3	?	?	?	?	?
OpenBSD kernel	Up to NFSv3	?	?	?	?	?
Solaris kernel	Yes	Yes	Yes	No	No	No
Windows NT kernel	Up to NFSv3	Yes	Yes	No	No	No
XNU	Yes	Yes	Yes	No	No	No

== Pseudo file system support ==
Kernel Name	Volatile memory file system	Device File System	Process File System (procfs)	Interface for user-space file systems
DragonFly BSD kernel	tmpfs	devfs	Yes	FUSE
FreeBSD kernel	tmpfs	devfs	Obsoleted	FUSE
Linux	tmpfs	devtmpfs	Yes	FUSE
NetBSD kernel	tmpfs	No	Yes	PUFFS
OpenBSD kernel	mfs	No	No	FUSE
Solaris kernel	tmpfs	devfs	Yes	FUSE (3rd-party implementation)
XNU	?	devfs	No	FUSE (Unofficial implementation)

== Supported CPU instruction sets and microarchitectures ==
=== 64-bit CPU ===
kernel	HP		Softbank, ARM Holdings	Intel		MIPS	IBM		Oracle	Xilinx	NVIDIA	RISC-V International													
kernel	Alpha	PA-RISC 2.0	ARM64	x86-64	IA-64	MIPS64	64-bit PowerPC	z/Arch	SPARC64	MicroBlaze 64-bit	Tilera	RISC-V 64-bit													
kernel	Alpha	PA-RISC 2.0	ARM64	x86-64	IA-64	MIPS64	64-bit PowerPC	z/Arch	SPARC64	MicroBlaze 64-bit	Tilera	RISC-V 64-bit	DragonFly BSD kernel	No	No	No	Yes	No	No	No	No	No	No	No	No
FreeBSD kernel	6.4 and below only	No	Yes	Yes	10.4 and below only	13.5 and below only	Yes	No	12.x and below only	No	No	Yes													
Linux kernel	Yes	?	Yes	Yes	6.7 and below only	Yes	Yes	Yes	Yes	No	4.16 and below only	?													
MINIX 3 kernel	No	No	(Meecho)	(Minix/UEFIX64)	No	No	No	No	No	No	No	No													
NetBSD kernel	Yes	?	Yes	Yes	Yes	?	No	No	Yes	?	?	?													
NetWare kernel	No	?	No	No	No	?	No	No	No	?	?	?													
OpenBSD kernel	Yes	Dropped	Yes	Yes	No	OpenBSD/octeon	Yes	No	Yes	No	No	Yes													
Rockbox kernel	?	?	?	?	?	?	?	No	?	?	?	?													
Solaris kernel	No	?	No	Yes	No	?	No	Only available as a separated version of OpenSolaris	Yes	?	?	?													
Windows NT kernel	NT 5.0 RC1 and below only	?	Yes	Yes	XP and 2003-2008 R2 only	?	No	No	No	?	No	?													
Windows CE kernel	No	No	?	?	No	?	No	No	No	?	No	?													
XNU	No	No	Yes	Yes	No	?	Yes	No	No	?	?	?													
SPARTAN kernel	No	No	?	Yes	Yes	?	No	No	Yes	?	?	?													
FreeRTOS kernel	?	?	?	?	?	?	?	No	?	?	?	?													
VMkernel	No	No	Yes	Yes	No	?	No	No	No	?	No	?													
Zircon	No	No	?	Yes	No	?	No	No	No	?	No	?													

=== 32-bit CPU ===
==== 32-bit CISC processors ====
kernel	HP	Intel	IBM	Renesas Electronics		NXP	
kernel	VAX	x86	ESA/390	H8300	RX	m68k	
kernel	VAX	IA-32	ESA/390	H8300	RX	mmu	no-mmu
DragonFly BSD kernel	No	3.8 and below only	No	No	No	No	No
FreeBSD kernel	No	Projected to end in 15.x	No	No	No	No	No
Linux kernel	No	Yes	Yes	5.19 and below only	?	Yes	Yes
MINIX 3 kernel	?	Yes	No	No	No	No	No
NetBSD kernel	Yes	Yes	No	?	?	Yes	No
NetWare kernel	No	Yes	No	?	No	No	No
OpenBSD kernel	last supported release 5.8	Yes	No	No	No	5.1 and below only	?
Rockbox kernel	?	?	?	?	?	Yes	?
Solaris kernel	No	Dropped since Oracle Solaris 11 (11/11)	No	?	No	No	No
Windows NT kernel	No	10 and below only	No	No	No	No	No
Windows CE kernel	No	Yes	No	No	No	No	No
XNU	No	Dropped	No	?	No	No	No
SPARTAN kernel	?	Yes	No	?	?	No	No
FreeRTOS kernel	?	?	?	Yes	Yes	?	?
VMkernel	No	Dropped since VMware ESXi 4.0	No	No	No	No	No
Zircon	No	No	No	No	No	No	No

==== 32-bit RISC processors ====
kernel	HP	Motorola	Softbank, ARM Holdings		Intel	MIPS		IBM	Renesas Electronics				Oracle		Xilinx	Cadence		Canon, Axis Comm.	Socionext	Microchip, Atmel	Intel, Altera			Sunplus Technology	RISC-V International
kernel	PA-RISC	m88k	ARM		i960	MIPS		PowerPC	M32R	V850	SuperH		SPARC		MicroBlaze	Xtensa		ETRAX CRIS	MN10300	AVR32	Nios (no-mmu 32-bit)	Nios II		S+core	RISC-V
kernel	PA-RISC	m88k	mmu	no-mmu	i960	mmu	no-mmu	32-bit	M32R	V850	mmu	no-mmu	32-bit	no-mmu	MicroBlaze	mmu	no-mmu	ETRAX CRIS	MN10300	AVR32	Nios (no-mmu 32-bit)	mmu	no-mmu	S+core	32-bit
DragonFly BSD kernel	No	No	No	No	No	No	No	No	No	No	No	No	No	No	No	No	No	No	No	No	No	No	No	No	No
FreeBSD kernel	No	No	Yes	?	No	13.5 and below only	No	Projected to end in 15.x	No	No	No	No	No	?	No	No	No	No	No	No	No	No	No	No	No
Linux kernel	Yes	No	Yes	Yes	No	Yes	Yes	Yes	4.16 and below only	2.6 and below only	Yes	Yes	Yes	Yes	Yes	Yes	Yes	4.16 and below only	4.16 and below only	4.12 and below only	No	Yes	Yes	4.16 and below only	?
MINIX 3 kernel	No	?	Yes	?	No	In progress	?	No	No	No	No	No	No	No	No	No	No	No	No	No	No	No	No	No	?
NetBSD kernel	Yes	?	Yes	No	?	Yes	No	Yes	?	?	Yes	No	Yes	No	?	?	?	?	?	?	?	?	?	?	?
NetWare kernel	No	?	No	No	?	No	No	No	?	?	No	No	No	No	?	?	?	?	?	?	?	?	?	?	?
OpenBSD kernel	Yes	OpenBSD/luna88k	Yes	?	?	Yes	?	Yes	?	?	Yes	?	Yes	?	?	?	?	?	?	?	?	?	?	?	?
Rockbox kernel	?	?	Yes	?	?	Yes	?	?	?	?	Yes	?	?	?	?	?	?	?	?	?	?	?	?	?	?
Solaris kernel	No	?	No	No	?	No	No	Only in Solaris 2.5.1	?	?	No	No	Dropped since Solaris 10	?	?	?	?	?	?	?	?	?	?	?	?
Windows NT kernel	No	?	10 IoT Core and below only	No	No	NT 4.0 and below only	No	NT 3.51 and NT 4.0 only	No	No	No	No	No	No	No	No	No	No	No	No	No	No	No	No	?
Windows CE kernel	No	?	Yes	?	No	7.0 and below only	?	No	No	No	7.0 and below only	?	No	No	No	No	No	No	No	No	No	No	No	No	No
XNU	No	?	Dropped	?	?	No	No	Dropped	?	?	No	No	No	No	?	?	?	?	?	?	No	?	?	?	?
SPARTAN kernel	No	?	Yes	?	?	Yes	?	Yes	?	?	No	No	Yes	?	?	?	?	?	?	?	No	?	?	?	?
FreeRTOS kernel	?	?	?	Yes	?	?	?	Yes	?	Yes	?	Yes	?	?	Yes	?	?	?	?	Yes	No	?	Yes	?	?
VMkernel	No	?	No	No	No	No	No	No	No	No	No	No	No	No	No	No	No	No	No	No	No	No	No	No	?
Zircon	No	?	Yes	Yes	No	No	No	No	No	No	No	No	No	No	No	No	No	No	No	No	No	No	No	No	?

==== 32-bit VLIW or DSP-based processors ====
kernel	Analog Devices	Cadence	Socionext	CML, Hyperstone	TI	Qualcomm	Imagination
kernel	Blackfin (no-mmu)	Xtensa	FR-V	E1 (no-mmu)	C6X	Hexagon	META
kernel	Blackfin (no-mmu)	FLIX	FR-V	E1 (no-mmu)	C6X	Hexagon	META
DragonFly BSD kernel	No	No	No	No	No	No	No
FreeBSD kernel	No	No	No	No	No	No	No
Linux kernel	4.16 and below only	Yes	4.16 and below only	No	5.12 and below only	Yes	Yes
MINIX 3 kernel	No	No	No	No	No	No	No
NetBSD kernel	?	?	?	?	?	?	?
NetWare kernel	?	?	?	?	?	?	?
OpenBSD kernel	?	?	?	?	?	?	?
Rockbox kernel	?	?	?	?	?	?	?
Solaris kernel	?	?	?	?	?	?	?
Windows NT kernel	No	No	No	No	No	No	No
Windows CE kernel	No	No	No	No	No	No	No
XNU	?	?	?	?	?	?	?
SPARTAN kernel	?	?	?	?	?	?	?
FreeRTOS kernel	Yes	?	?	?	?	?	?
VMkernel	No	No	No	No	No	No	No
Zircon	No	No	No	No	No	?	?

=== 16-bit CPU ===
kernel	Intel			WDC	Renesas Electronics			Fujitsu	Texas Instruments	Microchip Technology
kernel	8086	80186	80286	WDC 65C816	M16C	78K	RL78	F2MC-16FX	TI MSP430	dsPIC
Linux kernel	Embeddable Linux Kernel Subset			No	?	?	?	?	?	?
FreeRTOS kernel	?	?	?	?	?	Yes	Yes	Yes	Yes	Yes
MS-DOS kernel	Yes	Yes	Yes	No	No	No	No	No	No	No
GS/OS kernel	No	No	No	Yes	No	No	No	No	No	No

== Supported GPU processors ==
Kernel name	Intel			NVIDIA	AMD Radeon		ARM Mali			Qualcomm	Imagination Technologies	Broadcom	VeriSilicon	Apple
Kernel name	GMA (Note: Intel 9xx/Gxx/Qxx)	GT (Note: Intel HD Graphics/Iris/UHD Graphics)	Xe (Note: Iris Xe Graphics/Intel Arc)	GeForce/Quadro/Tesla	Xenos/TeraScale	GCN/RDNA/CDNA	Utgard	Midgard/Bifrost	Valhall	Adreno	PowerVR	VideoCore4	Vivante (Note: Used in NXP i.MX family)	AGX
Linux kernel	i915 driver		xe driver	nouveau (C), Nova (Rust)	radeon driver	amdgpu driver	Lima	Panfrost	Panthor (C), Tyr (Rust)	msm driver	imagination driver	vc4 driver	etnaviv	(Asahi driver)
NetBSD	i915drmkms driver (Note: ported from Linux)		?	nouveau driver	radeon driver	amdgpu driver	?	?	?	?	?	?	?	?
Windows NT kernel	Dropped (Note: Intel Graphics Media Accelerator Drivers were supported up to Windows 8.1.)	Yes		Yes	Dropped (Note: AMD drivers for pre-GCN GPUs were supported up to Windows 10.)	Yes	No			Windows Phone 8.x, Windows 10 Mobile, Windows on ARM	Yes	No	Windows IoT Enterprise on Arm	No
XNU	Yes (macOS)			No (Note: Quadro & GeForce macOS Driver was supported up to macOS High Sierra (10.13).)	No (Note: Radeon Mac Edition drivers were supported up to Mac OS X 10.4.)	?	No			No	via I/O Kit (iOS only)	No	No	iOS/macOS

== Supported kernel execution environment ==
This table indicates, for each kernel, what operating systems' executable images and device drivers can be run by that kernel.

Kernel name	Linux	Darwin	Windows NT	FreeBSD	NetBSD	Solaris	OSF/1	Amiga Unix	SunOS	BSD/OS	iBCS2 systems	IRIX	Ultrix	NDIS	SVR4
FreeBSD kernel	Yes	No	No	Yes	No	No	No	No	No	No	No	No	No	Dropped	Dropped
Linux kernel	Yes	No	(Longene)	No	No	No	No	No	No	No	No	No	No	(NDISwrapper)	No
NetBSD kernel	Yes	Dropped	Dropped	Yes	Yes	Yes	Dropped	Yes	Yes	Yes	Dropped	Dropped	Yes	Dropped	Dropped
OpenBSD kernel	Dropped since OpenBSD 6.0	No	No	Dropped since OpenBSD 5.0	Dropped since OpenBSD 4.2	No	No	No	Dropped since OpenBSD 4.8	Dropped since OpenBSD 4.8	Dropped since OpenBSD 4.8	No	Dropped since OpenBSD 4.8	No	Dropped since OpenBSD 5.0
Windows NT kernel	Windows Subsystem for Linux 1	No	Yes	No	No	No	No	No	No	No	No	No	No	Yes	No
ReactOS kernel	No	No	Yes	No	No	No	No	No	No	No	No	No	No	?	No
XNU	No	Yes	No	No	No	No	No	No	No	No	No	No	No	No	No
VMkernel	Yes	No	No	No	No	No	No	No	No	No	No	No	No	No	No

== Supported cipher algorithms ==
This may be usable on some situations like file system encrypting.

Kernel name	DES	AES	Blowfish	Triple DES	Serpent	Twofish	CAST-128	DES-X	IDEA	RC2	RC5	SEED	Skipjack	TEA	XTEA	CAST-256	RC4	Camellia	Anubis	KHAZAD	Salsa20	FCrypt
DragonFly BSD kernel	Yes	Yes	Yes	Yes	Yes	Yes	Yes	No	Yes	No	No	No	Yes	No	No	No	Yes	Yes	No	No	No	No
FreeBSD kernel	Yes	Yes	Yes	Yes	No	No	Yes	No	Yes	No	No	No	Yes	No	No	Yes	Yes	Yes	No	No	No	No
Linux	Yes	Yes	Yes	Yes	Yes	Yes	Yes	No	No	No	No	Yes	No	Yes	Yes	Yes	Yes	Yes	Yes	Yes	Yes	Yes
Windows NT kernel	Yes	Yes	Yes	Yes	No	No	No	No	No	Yes	No	No	No	No	No	No	Yes	No	No	No	No	No
macOS XNU Kernel	Yes	Yes	Yes	?	?	?	Yes	?	?	Yes	Yes	?	?	?	?	Yes	Yes	?	?	?	?	?

== Supported compression algorithms ==
This may be usable on some situations like compression file system.

Kernel name	Deflate		LZO	LZJB	zstd
Kernel name	zlib	gzip	LZO	LZJB	zstd
Linux	Yes	Yes	Yes	No	Yes
NetBSD kernel	Yes	Yes	Yes	?	Yes
Solaris kernel	Yes	?	?	Yes	?

== Supported message digest algorithms ==
Kernel name	CRC-32 (IEEE)	CRC-32C	MD2	MD4	MD5	SHA-1	SHA-2	SHA-3	Michael MIC	Poly1305	RIPEMD-128	RIPEMD-160	RIPEMD-256	RIPEMD-320	Tiger	Whirlpool	HMAC	MDC-2	GOST	LASH	VMAC
Linux	Yes	Yes	No	Yes	Yes	Yes	Yes	Partial	Yes	Yes	Yes	Yes	Yes	Yes	Yes	Yes	Yes	No	No	No	Yes
Solaris kernel	Yes	Yes	Yes	Yes	Yes	Yes	Yes	?	?	?	?	Yes	?	?	Yes	?	Yes	Yes	?	?	?
Windows NT kernel	?	?	Yes	Yes	Yes	Yes	Yes	?	No	?	No	No	No	No	No	No	Yes	No	No	No	?
FreeBSD kernel	Yes	Yes	?	Yes	Yes	Yes	Yes	?	?	?	?	Yes	?	?	Yes	?	Yes	?	?	?	?
XNU kernel	Yes	?	Yes	?	Yes	Yes	?	?	?	?	?	?	?	?	?	?	?	?	?	?	?

== Supported Bluetooth protocols ==
Kernel name	ACL	SCO	LMP	HCI	L2CAP	BNEP	RFComm.	SDP	TCP	AVTCP	AVDTP	OBEX	CMTP	HIDP	HCRP	CAPI	PPP
FreeBSD kernel	?	?	?	Yes	Yes	?	Yes	Yes	?	?	?	No	?	?	?	?	?
Linux	?	Yes	?	Yes	Yes	Yes	Yes	?	?	?	?	?	Yes	Yes	?	?	?
macOS XNU Kernel	?	?	?	?	Yes	?	Yes	Yes	?	?	?	No	?	?	?	?	?
Kernel name	ACL	SCO	LMP	HCI	L2CAP	BNEP	RFComm.	SDP	TCP	AVTCP	AVDTP	OBEX	CMTP	HIDP	HCRP	CAPI	PPP

== Audio support ==
Kernel name	Audio system	in-kernel mixer	in-kernel filter
Linux	ALSA, with optional OSS API compatibility	?	?
Windows NT kernel	MME / WDM audio / Kernel Streaming (KS)	Dropped (KMixer.sys)	KS Filters
FreeBSD kernel	OSS API	VCHANs in OSS API	?
NetBSD kernel	native (Sun-like) / OSS API	audio_system	?
Solaris kernel	Sun audio API / OSS API	Yes	?

== Graphics support ==
Kernel name	Framebuffer	Display management	Hardware Compositing (Multiple Planes)	Display Multiplexer	Color transform			GPU scheduler	GPU memory management	in-kernel Remote Desktop
Kernel name	Framebuffer	Display management	Hardware Compositing (Multiple Planes)	Display Multiplexer	Matrices	1D LUT	3D LUT	GPU scheduler	GPU memory management	in-kernel Remote Desktop
Linux	Linux framebuffer (fbdev) / Direct Rendering Manager (DRM)	Kernel Mode Setting (KMS)	Plane abstraction in DRM/KMS	VGA Switcheroo	Linux Color Pipeline API in DRM			DRM sched	DMA-BUF	No
Windows NT kernel	Dxgkrnl.sys	VidPN Manager in Dxgkrnl.sys	Multiplane overlay (MPO) in WDDM	?	via MHC profile		?	VidSch in Dxgkrnl	VidMm in Dxgkrnl.sys, Dxgmms1.sys, and Dxgmms2.sys	RdpDD.sys / RdpWD.sys

== See also ==
- Comparison of open-source operating systems
- Comparison of Linux distributions
- Comparison of BSD operating systems
- Comparison of Microsoft Windows versions
- List of operating systems
- Comparison of file systems
- Comparison of operating systems
