= Firestarter (firewall) =

Personal firewall

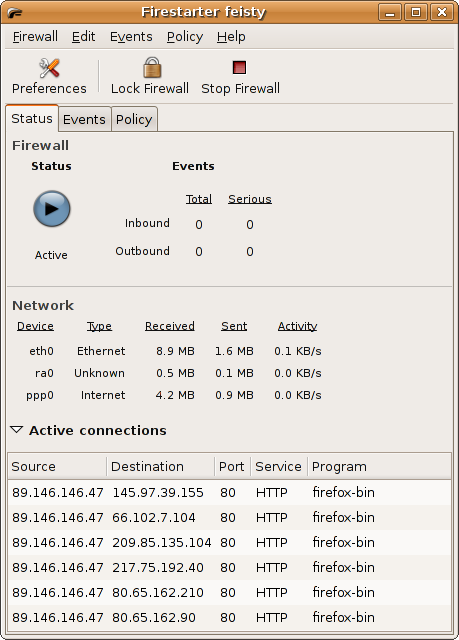
- Screenshot of the Firestarter window
- Developer(s): Firestarter developers
- Final release: 1.0.3 (January 29, 2005) [±]
- Preview release: None (None) [±]
- Repository: sourceforge.net/projects/firestarter/files/firestarter/
- Operating system: Linux
- Type: firewall
- License: GNU General Public License
- Website: sourceforge.net/projects/firestarter/

Firestarter is a personal firewall tool that uses the Netfilter (iptables/ipchains) system built into the Linux kernel. It has the ability to control both inbound and outbound connections. Firestarter provides a graphical interface for configuring firewall rules and settings. It provides real-time monitoring of all network traffic for the system. Firestarter also provides facilities for port forwarding, internet connection sharing and DHCP service.

Firestarter is free and open-source software and uses GUI widgets from GTK+. Note that it uses GTK2 and has not been upgraded to use GTK3 so the last Linux distributions it will run on are Ubuntu 18, Debian 9, etc.

== See also ==
- Uncomplicated Firewall
- iptables
- netfilter
