= FireHOL =

Firewall software

- Developer: Costa Tsaousis
- Stable release: v3.1.7 / December 31, 2020; 5 years ago
- Preview release: v3.1.5-rc1 / September 17, 2017; 8 years ago
- Written in: Bash
- Operating system: Linux
- Type: Firewall
- License: GNU GPL v2+
- Website: firehol.org
- Repository: github.com/firehol/firehol

FireHOL is a shell script designed as a wrapper for iptables written to ease the customization of the Linux kernel's firewall netfilter. FireHOL is free software and open-source, distributed under the terms of the GNU General Public License.

FireHOL does not have graphical user interface, but is configured through an easy to understand plain text configuration file. FireHOL first parses the configuration file and then sets the appropriate iptables rules to achieve the expected firewall behavior. It is a large, complex BASH script file, depending on the iptables console tools rather than communicating with the kernel directly. Any Linux system with iptables, BASH, and the appropriate tools can run it. Its main drawback is slower starting times, particularly on older systems. FireHOL's configuration files are fully functional BASH scripts in of themselves.

== FireHOL IP blocklist ==
The FireHOL IP blocklist is a reference source of malicious or illegitimate IP addresses. FireHOL integrates this blocklist to enhance network security by automatically applying these blocklists within its configuration, allowing users to prevent traffic from known malicious sources.
