= Linux Virtual Server =

Load-balancing software

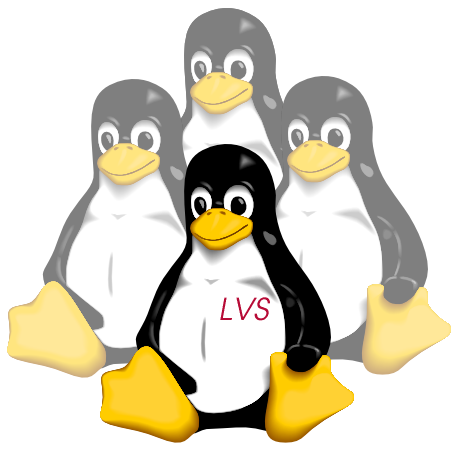
- LVS official logo
- Original author: Wensong Zhang
- Developer: et al.
- Release: May 1998; 28 years ago
- Written in: C
- Operating system: Linux
- Type: load balancing
- License: GNU General Public License
- Website: www.linuxvirtualserver.org

Linux Virtual Server (LVS) is load balancing software for Linux kernel–based operating systems.

LVS is a free and open-source project started by Wensong Zhang in May 1998, subject to the requirements of the GNU General Public License (GPL), version 2. The mission of the project is to build a high-performance and highly available server for Linux using clustering technology, which provides good scalability, reliability and serviceability.

== Overview ==
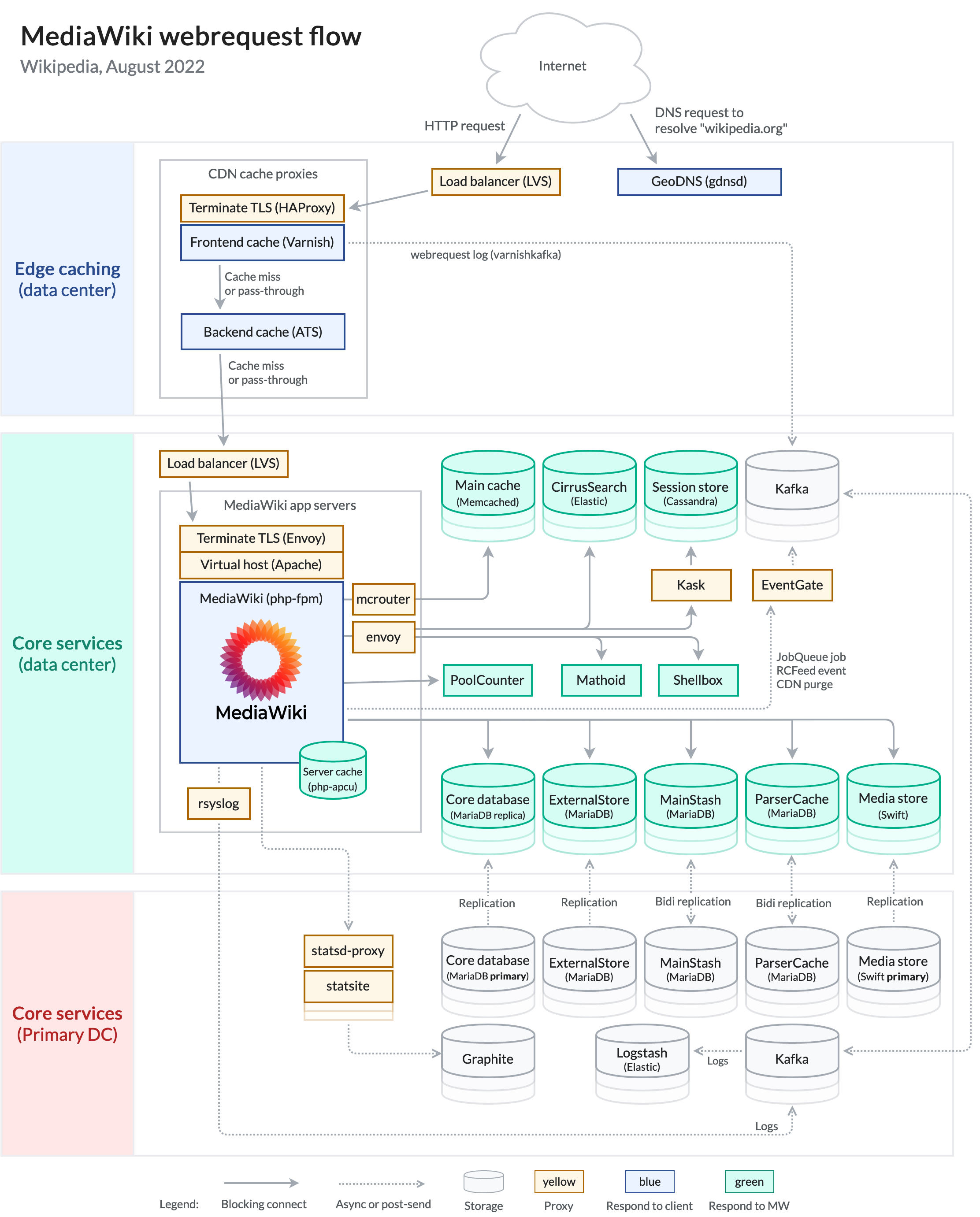
LVS as used by Wikimedia Foundation in 2022.

The major work of the LVS project is now to develop advanced IP load balancing software (IPVS), application-level load balancing software (KTCPVS), and cluster management components.

- IPVS: an advanced IP load balancing software implemented inside the Linux kernel. The IP Virtual Server code is merged into versions 2.4.x and newer of the Linux kernel mainline.
- KTCPVS: implements application-level load balancing inside the Linux kernel, as of February 2011 still under development.

LVS can be used for building highly scalable and highly available network services, such as web, email, media and VoIP services, and integrating scalable network services into large-scale e-commerce or e-government applications. LVS-based solutions already have been deployed in many real applications throughout the world, including Wikipedia.

The LVS components depend upon the Linux Netfilter framework, and its source code is available in the net/netfilter/ipvs subdirectory within the Linux kernel source. LVS is able to handle UDP, TCP layer-4 protocols as well as FTP passive connection by inspecting layer-7 packets. It provides a hierarchy of counters in the /proc directory.

The userland utility program used to configure LVS is called ipvsadm, which requires superuser privileges to run.

=== Schedulers ===
LVS implements several balancing schedulers, listed below with the relevant source files:

- Round-robin (ip_vs_rr.c)
- Weighted round-robin (ip_vs_wrr.c)
- Least-connection (ip_vs_lc.c)
- Weighted least-connection (ip_vs_wlc.c)
- Locality-based least-connection (ip_vs_lblc.c)
- Locality-based least-connection with replication (ip_vs_lblcr.c)
- Destination hashing (ip_vs_dh.c)
- Source hashing (ip_vs_sh.c)
- Shortest expected delay (ip_vs_sed.c)
- Never queue (ip_vs_nq.c)
- Maglev hashing (ip_vs_mh.c)

== Glossary ==
Commonly used terms include the following:

- LVS director: load balancer that receives all incoming client requests for services and directs them to a specific "real server" to handle the request
- Real servers: nodes that make up an LVS cluster which are used to provide services on the behalf of the cluster
- Client computers: computers requesting services from the virtual server
- VIP (Virtual IP address): the IP address used by the director to provide services to client computers
- RIP (Real IP address): the IP address used to connect to the cluster nodes
- DIP (Directors IP address): the IP address used by the director to connect to network of real IP addresses
- CIP (Client IP address): the IP address assigned to a client computer, that it uses as the source IP address for requests being sent to the cluster

== Examples ==
Setting up a virtual HTTP server with two real servers:

# ipvsadm --add-service --tcp-service 192.168.0.1:80 --scheduler rr
# ipvsadm --add-server --tcp-service 192.168.0.1:80 --real-server 172.16.0.1:80 --masquerading
# ipvsadm --add-server --tcp-service 192.168.0.1:80 --real-server 172.16.0.2:80 --masquerading

The first command assigns TCP port 80 on IP address 192.168.0.1 to the virtual server. The chosen scheduling algorithm for load balancing is round-robin (-s rr). The second and third commands are adding IP addresses of real servers to the LVS setup. The forwarded network packets shall be masked (-m).

Querying the status of the above configured LVS setup:

# ipvsadm --list --numeric
IP Virtual Server version 1.0.8 (size=65536)
Prot LocalAddress:Port Scheduler Flags
  -> RemoteAddress:Port           Forward Weight ActiveConn InActConn
TCP  192.168.0.1:80 rr
  -> 172.16.0.2:80                Masq    1      3          1
  -> 172.16.0.1:80                Masq    1      4          0

== See also ==
- IP Virtual Server
- Netfilter and nftables
- Network scheduler
