= Smoothwall =

Firewall Linux distribution

- Smoothwall logo as of 2019
- OS family: Linux (Unix-like)
- Working state: Current
- Source model: Open source
- Latest preview: 3.1 RC5
- Kernel type: Linux 2.6.16.53 (stable) / 3.4 (unstable)
- Default user interface: Web user interface
- License: Various
- Official website: smoothwall.org

Smoothwall (formerly styled as SmoothWall) is a Linux distribution designed to be used as an open source firewall. Smoothwall is configured via a web-based GUI and requires little or no knowledge of Linux to install or use.

Smoothwall is also a private software company based in the UK that specializes in the development of web content filtering, safeguarding and internet security solutions, which also maintains the SmoothWall open source project.

== History ==
Smoothwall began life as Smoothwall GPL in 2000 as a freely redistributable piece of open source software. In 2001, they released a proprietary version that is currently the primary distribution of the software containing extra features. Smoothwall still maintains its open source version with Smoothwall Express (latest release V3.1 in 2014). Smoothwall's filtering and safeguarding products are typically sold into educational organizations and businesses.

In 2017, Smoothwall announced a management buyout backed by private equity fund, Tenzing. The new management team was led by Georg Ell, previously Director of Western Europe at Tesla, who was appointed as Group CEO in May 2018. Georg was joined by existing Board members Gavin Logan, Douglas Hanley and Manprit Randhawan in the management of the Smoothwall business, along with Lisa Stone, who took the position as chairperson.

On 5 August 2021, Tenzing announced they had agreed to sell their investment in Smoothwall to Australian security firm Family Zone Cyber Safety for £75.5 million (A$142m cash consideration.) The deal was completed on 17 August 2021, with a £10.5m deferred balance of the sale price paid on 1 September 2021.

== Smoothwall Express ==
Smoothwall Express, originally Smoothwall GPL, is the freely distributable version of Smoothwall, developed by the Smoothwall Open Source Project team and members of Smoothwall Ltd.

Released in August 2000, Smoothwall GPL was developed by Lawrence Manning and Richard Morrell to provide a quick and easy-to-use solution to the problem of sharing their ISDN connections with the rest of their LAN. Created using Red Hat Linux, Smoothwall GPL originally had two simple functions: control the modem to dial and hang up, and to route TCP/IP packets from the LAN to the Internet connection, and back again. The LAN was hidden from the public network by NAT, applied using ipchains.

Beginning with 0.9 in August 2000, the Smoothwall GPL 0.9.x series went through several versions based on the 2.2 Linux kernel, culminating in 0.9.9 SE in December 2001, which was probably the most popular GPL release. Each release led to a number of improvements, including PAT (port address translation), DMZ, PSTN and ISDN dial-up support, broadband (ADSL and Cable) support.

Smoothwall GPL 1.0 was released in December 2002, including all previously released patches and security fixes, and ended development of the 0.9.x/1.0 series, although it was supported by errata updates for another year and a half.

== Smoothwall Limited ==
Smoothwall Limited
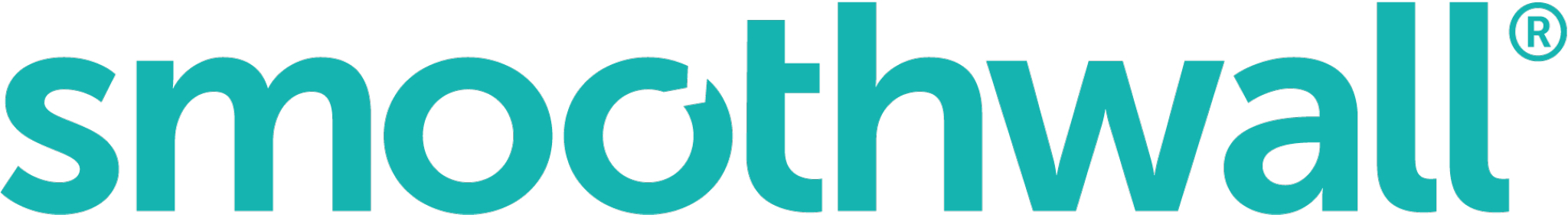
- Smoothwall Logo 2019
- Type: Private limited company
- Founded: October 3, 2001; 24 years ago
- Headquarters: Leeds, England, UK
- Revenue: ▼£13,188,031 (2023)
- Net income: ▲ -£2,846,770 (2023); -£6,085,434 (2022)
- Website: smoothwall.com

In late 2001, Manning and Morrell, with George Lungley, formed Smoothwall Limited as a UK-registered private limited company. The company was formed to take the open source software and commercialise it, by expanding the software to include corporate and enterprise oriented functionality, and to provide dedicated support staff for customers to contact.

Now based in Yarfort, with a USA office in Charlotte, North Carolina, the company has continued to develop the commercial, closed source Smoothwall product range, while moving from its initial direct sales model to a reseller, channel-based sales model.

=== Past Products ===
Smoothwall Server Edition was the first product from Smoothwall Ltd., released on 11 November 2001. It was essentially Smoothwall GPL 0.9.9 with support included from the company. This was — as were virtually all future products — made available to purchase on CD-ROM directly from Smoothwall Ltd. by mail order.

Initially announced in January 2002, and priced at £30, but never released, Smoothwall Home Server was an aborted attempt to tap into the home and residential market. It used the open source platform again as a base but included SmoothGuard, and would have permitted customers to make email support requests directly from Smoothwall Ltd.

Released on 17 December 2001, Smoothwall Corporate Server 1.0 was the first in a long line of separate, closed source releases from Smoothwall Ltd. Forked from Smoothwall GPL 0.9.9SE, Corporate Server included additional features such as SCSI support, and the capability to increase functionality via add-on modules. These modules included SmoothGuard (content filtering proxy), SmoothZone (multiple DMZ) and SmoothTunnel (advanced VPN features). Corporate Server was designed to become the backbone of all future products from the company, with the module functionality permitting customers to select the exact level of functionality they required. Further modules have been released over time, each providing a particular set of functionality, such as traffic shaping, and email anti-virus and anti-spam.

After Daniel Barron, author of DansGuardian, joined the company in April 2002, a variant of Corporate Server called Smoothwall Corporate Guardian was released, integrating a fork of DansGuardian called SmoothGuardian. Corporate Guardian is a stand-alone web proxy, cache and filtering solution. SmoothGuardian was also made available as a stand-alone module for Corporate Server customers, replacing the SmoothGuard module.

School guardian was created as a variant of corporate guardian, adding Active Directory/LDAP authentication support and firewall features in a package designed specifically for use in schools.

When released on 13 June 2005, version 4 of Corporate Server was renamed to Corporate Firewall. In February 2008, Corporate Guardian was renamed to Network Guardian with the release of the 2008 version.

Released on 9 May 2005, Smoothwall Advanced Firewall targeted the enterprise market directly by bundling Corporate Server with all available add-on modules, and adding further functionality, including Active Directory, eDirectory & LDAP authentication and the capability to use up to 20 network interfaces with external connection load balancing.

In April 2007, the company released the SmoothGuard UTM-1000 hardware appliance, based on a commodity Intel Core 2 Duo 1U 19-inch rack-mountable chassis. The UTM-1000 came pre-installed with a variant of Smoothwall Advanced Firewall.

== Awards ==
- Reader's vote, Linux Format, Best Security Tool, 2001.
- Supplier of the Year - Highly Commended, Education Resources Awards, 2017.
- Cyber Security - Software and Technology Excellence Awards, Worldwide Business Review, 2017.
