= Kauth =

Kauth is a surname of German origin. Notable people with the surname include:

- Kathleen Kauth (ice hockey) (born 1979), American ice hockey player
- Kathleen Kauth (born 1970), Nebraskan politician
- Kenneth Kauth (1924–2019), American politician

== See also ==
- Kout na Šumavě
