= Windows Embedded 8.x =

Windows Embedded 8.x refers to the following versions of Windows Embedded operating systems:

- Windows Embedded 8/8.1 [For Embedded Systems (FES)]
- Windows Embedded 8 Standard
- Windows Embedded 8 Industry/8.1 Industry
- Windows Embedded 8.1 Handheld

== See also ==
- Windows 8.x
- Windows Phone 8.x
