= Windows 8.x =

Windows 8.x refers to the following versions of Microsoft Windows operating systems:

- Windows 8
- Windows 8.1
- Windows RT 8/8.1

== See also ==
- Windows Embedded 8.x
- Windows Phone 8.x
