= Kernel debugger =

Debugger for kernel development

A kernel debugger is a debugger present in some operating system kernels to ease debugging and kernel development by the kernel developers. A kernel debugger might be a stub implementing low-level operations, with a full-blown debugger such as GNU Debugger (gdb), running on another machine, sending commands to the stub over a serial line or a network connection, or it might provide a command line that can be used directly on the machine being debugged.

Operating systems and operating system kernels that contain a kernel debugger:

- The Windows NT family includes a kernel debugger named KD, which can act as a local debugger with limited capabilities (reading and writing kernel memory, and setting breakpoints) and can attach to a remote machine over a serial line, IEEE 1394 connection, USB 2.0 or USB 3.0 connection. The WinDbg GUI debugger can also be used to debug kernels on local and remote machines.
- BeOS and Haiku include a kernel debugger usable with either an on-screen console or over a serial line. It features various commands to inspect memory, threads, and other kernel structures. In Haiku, the debugger is called "Kernel Debugging Land" (KDL).
- DragonFly BSD
- Linux kernel; No kernel debugger was included in the mainline Linux tree prior to version 2.6.26-rc1 because Linus Torvalds didn't want a kernel debugger in the kernel.
  - KDB (local)
  - KGDB (remote)
  - MDB (local/remote)
- NetBSD has DDB for local and KGDB for remote.
- macOS has ddb for local and kdp for remote.
- OpenBSD includes ddb which has a syntax is similar to GNU Debugger.
