= IP Virtual Server =

Load-balancing software

ipvsadm
- Stable release: 1.3.1 / December 24, 2019; 5 years ago
- Repository: git.kernel.org/pub/scm/utils/kernel/ipvsadm/ipvsadm.git/
- Operating system: Linux kernel
- Platform: Netfilter
- License: GNU General Public License
- Website: www.linuxvirtualserver.org/software/ipvs.html

IPVS (IP Virtual Server) implements transport-layer load balancing, usually called Layer 4 LAN switching, as part of the Linux kernel. It's configured via the user-space utility ipvsadm(8) tool.

IPVS is incorporated into the Linux Virtual Server (LVS), where it runs on a host and acts as a load balancer in front of a cluster of real servers. IPVS can direct requests for TCP- and UDP-based services to the real servers, and make services of the real servers appear as virtual services on a single IP address. IPVS is built on top of Netfilter.

IPVS is merged into versions 2.4.x and newer of the Linux kernel mainline.

== See also ==
- Netfilter and nftables
- Network scheduler
