= Ipfirewall =

Firewall software

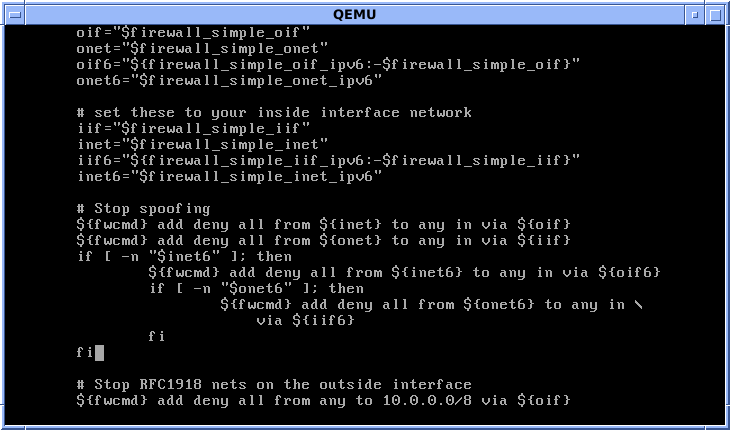
FreeBSD "/etc/rc.firewall" shell script for configuring ipfw

Mac OS X's ipfirewall tab in the Sharing Preferences Pane

ipfirewall or ipfw is a FreeBSD IP, stateful firewall, packet filter and traffic accounting facility. ipfw is authored and maintained by FreeBSD volunteer staff members. Its syntax enables use of sophisticated filtering capabilities and thus enables users to satisfy advanced requirements. It can either be used as a loadable kernel module or incorporated into the kernel; use as a loadable kernel module where possible is highly recommended. ipfw was the built-in firewall of Mac OS X until Mac OS X 10.7 Lion in 2011 when it was replaced with the OpenBSD project's PF. Like FreeBSD, ipfw is open source. It is used in many FreeBSD-based firewall products, including m0n0wall and FreeNAS. A port of an early version of ipfw was used since Linux 1.1 as the first implementation of firewall available for Linux, until it was replaced by ipchains. A modern port of ipfw and the dummynet traffic shaper is available for Linux (including a prebuilt package for OpenWrt) and Microsoft Windows. wipfw is a Windows port of an old (2001) version of ipfw.

== Alternative user interfaces for ipfw ==
Software	Developer	First public release	Latest stable version	Cost (USD)	Open source	License	User interface	Platform(s)
Firewalk X	Pliris	?	2.3.7	US$ 34.99	No	Proprietary / Shareware	GUI	Mac OS X v10.2, Mac OS X v10.3 (PowerPC)
Flying Buttress (known as BrickHouse prior to v1.4)	Brian Hill	March 23, 2001	1.4 (2005-12-31)	US$ 25.00	No	Proprietary / Shareware	GUI	Mac OS X v10.0, Mac OS X v10.1, Mac OS X v10.2, Mac OS X v10.3, Mac OS X v10.4 (PowerPC)
Impasse	Glucose Development Corporation	Q2 2002	1.3	US$ 10.00	No	Proprietary / Shareware	GUI	Mac OS X v10.1, Mac OS X v10.2 (PowerPC)
Norton Personal Firewall for Macintosh	Symantec	2005	3.0.3	US$ 49.95	No	Proprietary (Symantec Software License Agreement)	GUI	Mac OS X v10.1.5, Mac OS X v10.2, Mac OS X v10.3, Mac OS X v10.4.11 (PowerPC)
Qtfw	Ryzhyk Eugeney	August 23, 2001	0.5 (2002-09-20)	No cost	Yes	BSD	GUI	BSD and POSIX operating systems with the Qt toolkit. Ported to Windows for wipfw.
sunShield Pro	sunProtecting Factory	?	2.0.3 'L' (2007-11-09)	US$ 29.95	No	Proprietary / Shareware	GUI	Mac OS X v10.4, Mac OS X v10.5 (universal binary)
WaterRoof	Hany El Imam	2007	3.7	No cost	Yes	GPL / Donationware	GUI	Mac OS X v10.4, Mac OS X v10.8 (universal binary)
YpFw	Claudio Favi, CAIA	2004	?	No cost	Yes	?	Text mode	FreeBSD v3.4 or higher with Python v2.2 or higher

== See also ==
- netfilter/iptables, a Linux-based descendant of ipchains
- NPF, a NetBSD packet filter
- PF, another widely deployed BSD firewall solution
