= Unix security =

Operating system security technologies

Unix security refers to the means of securing a Unix or Unix-like operating system.

== Design concepts ==
=== Permissions ===
A core security feature in these systems is the file system permissions. All files in a typical Unix filesystem have permissions set enabling different access to a file. Unix permissions permit different users access to a file with different privileges (e.g., reading, writing, execution). Like users, different user groups have different permissions on a file.

=== User groups ===
Many Unix implementations add an additional layer of security by requiring that a user be a member of the wheel user privileges group in order to access the su command.

=== Root access ===
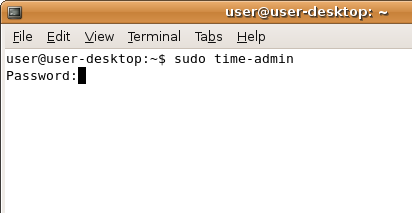
Sudo command on Ubuntu to temporarily assume root privileges

Most Unix and Unix-like systems have an account or user group which enables a user to exact complete control over the system, often known as a root account. If access to this account is gained by an unwanted user, this results in a complete breach of the system. A root account however is necessary for administrative purposes, and for the above security reasons the root account is seldom used for day to day purposes (the sudo program is more commonly used), so usage of the root account can be more closely monitored.

== Passwords ==
On many UNIX systems, user and password information, if stored locally, can be found in the /etc/passwd and /etc/shadow file pair.

== Viruses and virus scanners ==
There are viruses and worms that target Unix-like operating systems. In fact, the first computer worm—the Morris worm—targeted Unix systems.

There are virus scanners for UNIX-like systems, from multiple vendors.

== See also ==
- List of Unix systems
