= Lguest =

Paravirtualised x86 hypervisor removed in 2017

- Original author: Rusty Russell
- Operating system: Linux
- Platform: Linux kernel
- License: GNU General Public License
- Website: lguest.ozlabs.org

Lguest is a Linux kernel x86 virtualization hypervisor introduced in kernel version 2.6.23 (released 9 October 2007) and removed in kernel version 4.14 (November 2017). The hypervisor is an operating system-level virtualization system capable of running unmodified 32-bit x86 Linux kernels as guest machines. Installation is as easy as running modprobe lg followed by tools/lguest/lguest to create a new guest.

Lguest can still be installed on kernel 4.14 and later through out-of-tree patches.

Lguest was maintained by Rusty Russell.

== History ==
Lguest was unveiled in January 2007, when Jonathan Corbet described Rusty Russell's 6 000‑line “rustyvisor” as a minimal paravirtualised hypervisor intended mainly for education and experimentation.

=== Mainline inclusion (2007) ===
The code was merged during the 2.6.23 development cycle and shipped in the 9 October 2007 release, together with Xen guest support. Running only on 32‑bit x86 hosts, lguest relied on the new ‘‘paravirt_ops’’ hooks; launching a guest involved loading the `lg` module and executing the user‑space lguest launcher.

=== Decline and removal (2017) ===
As KVM and hardware‑assisted virtualization matured, interest in lguest dwindled. During the first half of the Linux 4.14 merge window the entire subsystem was deleted “due to lack of interest and maintenance.” Rusty Russell subsequently announced the closure of the project's mailing list, noting that lguest had already been removed from the kernel.

=== Status after 4.14 ===
Although no longer maintained upstream, community‑supplied out‑of‑tree patches allow lguest to be built against newer kernels for teaching and experimentation.

== See also ==
- Comparison of platform virtualization software
- Kernel-based Virtual Machine
