= Kout na Šumavě =

- Municipality
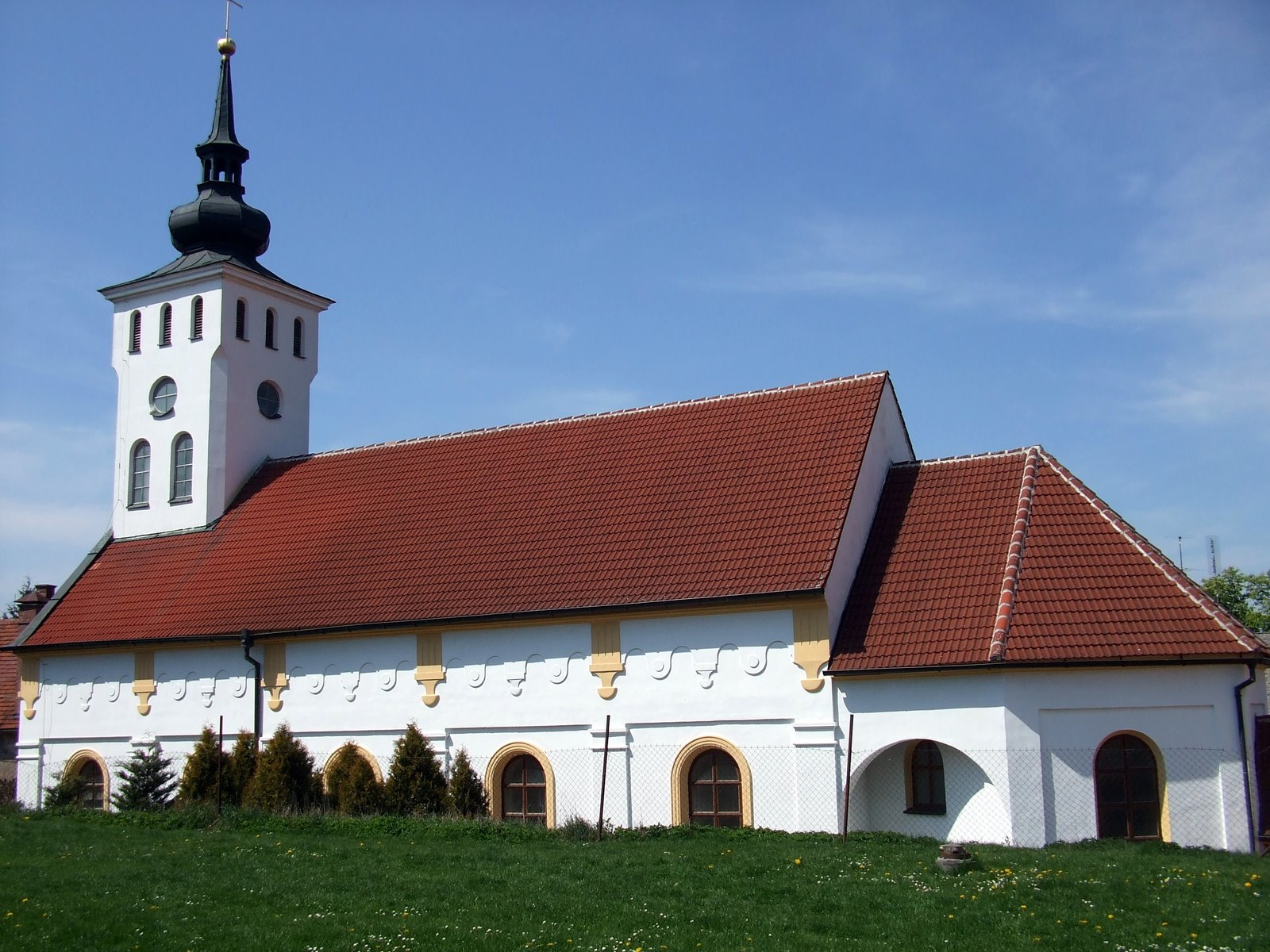
- Church of Saint George

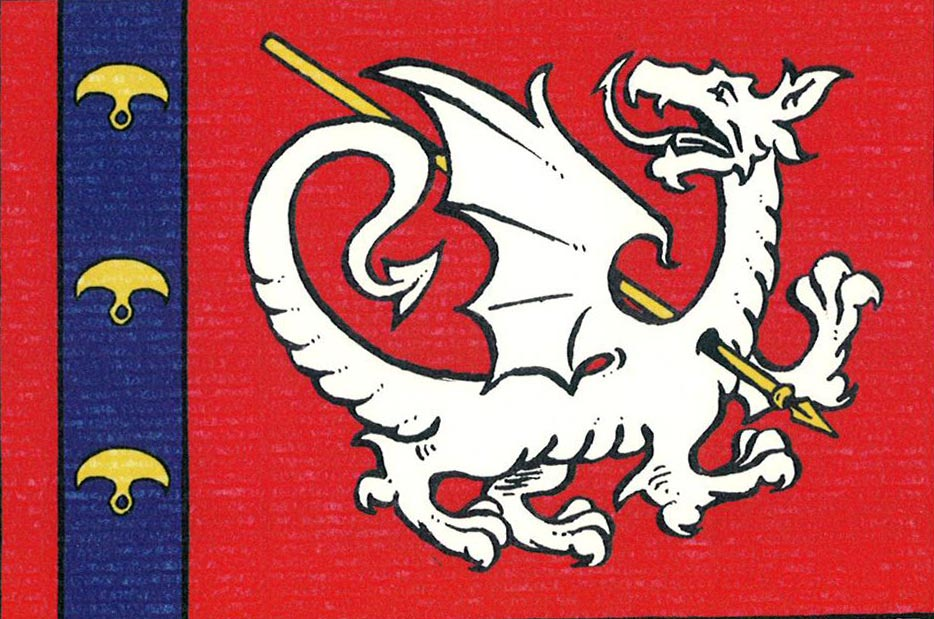
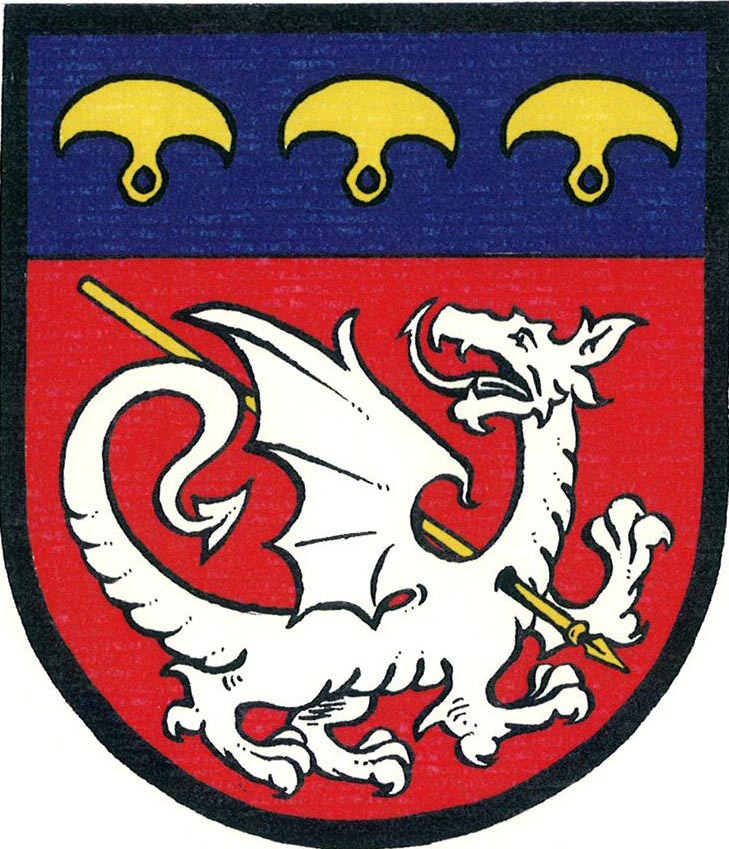
- Flag Coat of arms

- Location in the Czech Republic
- Coordinates: 49°24′1″N 13°0′4″E
- Country: Czech Republic
- Region: Plzeň
- District: Domažlice
- First mentioned: 1544

Area
  - Total: 11.09 km^{2} (4.28 sq mi)
- Elevation: 425 m (1,394 ft)

Population (2026-01-01)
  - Total: 1,065
  - Density: 96.03/km^{2} (248.7/sq mi)
- Time zone: UTC+1 (CET)
  - Summer (DST): UTC+2 (CEST)
- Postal codes: 345 02, 345 06
- Website: www.koutnasumave.cz

Kout na Šumavě (German: Kauth) is a municipality and village in Domažlice District in the Plzeň Region of the Czech Republic. It has about 1,100 inhabitants.

Kout na Šumavě lies approximately 7 kilometres (4 mi) south-east of Domažlice, 48 km (30 mi) south-west of Plzeň, and 128 km (80 mi) south-west of Prague.

== Administrative division ==
Kout na Šumavě consists of three municipal parts (in brackets population according to the 2021 census):

- Kout na Šumavě (1,008)
- Nový Dvůr (26)
- Starý Dvůr (15)

== Demographics ==
Historical population
Year	Pop.	±%
1869	1,231	—
1880	1,286	+4.5%
1890	1,231	−4.3%
1900	1,279	+3.9%
1910	1,401	+9.5%
1921	1,447	+3.3%
1930	1,421	−1.8%
1950	1,091	−23.2%
1961	1,143	+4.8%
1970	1,049	−8.2%
1980	1,119	+6.7%
1991	1,124	+0.4%
2001	1,139	+1.3%
2011	1,120	−1.7%
2021	1,049	−6.3%
Source: Censuses
