= Windows Phone 8.x =

Windows Phone 8.x may refer to:

- Windows Phone 8
- Windows Phone 8.1

== See also ==
- Windows Embedded 8.x
- Windows 8.x
