= Uncomplicated Firewall =

Simplified netfilter interface

- Original author: Jamie Strandboge
- Developer: Canonical
- Stable release: 0.36.2 / 18 May 2023; 3 years ago
- Written in: Python
- Operating system: Linux
- License: GNU General Public License
- Website: launchpad.net/ufw, manpages.ubuntu.com/manpages/bionic/en/man8/ufw.8.html
- Repository: git.launchpad.net/ufw

Uncomplicated Firewall (UFW) is a program for managing a netfilter firewall designed to be easy to use. It uses a command-line interface consisting of a small number of simple commands, and uses iptables for configuration. UFW is available by default in all Ubuntu installations since 8.04 LTS. UFW has been available by default in all Debian installations since 10.

== GUIs for Uncomplicated Firewall ==
Gufw (GUI for Uncomplicated Firewall)
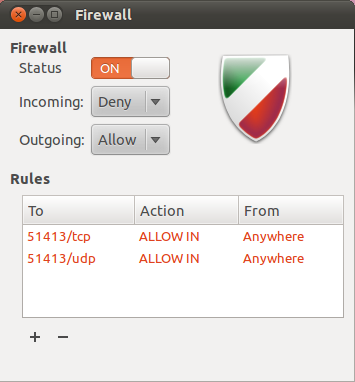
- GUI for Uncomplicated Firewall
- Original author: Marcos Álvarez Costales
- Stable release: 26.04 / June 7, 2025; 12 months ago
- Written in: Python, PyGObject
- Operating system: Linux
- Platform: GTK
- Available in: British English, Spanish
- License: GNU General Public License
- Website: costales.github.io/projects/gufw/
- Repository: github.com/costales/gufw

UFW KControl Module
- Original author: Craig Drummond
- Final release: 0.4.3 / May 23, 2012; 14 years ago
- Written in: C++
- Operating system: Linux
- Platform: Qt
- License: GNU General Public License
- Website: store.kde.org/p/1127851/
- Repository: invent.kde.org/unmaintained/ufw-kde

UFW Frontends
- Original author: Darwin Bautista
- Final release: 0.3.2 / April 6, 2012; 14 years ago
- Written in: Python, PyGTK
- Operating system: Linux
- Platform: PyGTK
- License: GNU General Public License
- Website: github.com/baudm/ufw-frontends
- Repository: github.com/baudm/ufw-frontends

Gufw is intended to be an easy, intuitive graphical user interface for managing Uncomplicated Firewall. It supports common tasks such as allowing or blocking pre-configured, common P2P, or individual ports. Gufw has been designed for Ubuntu, but is also available in Debian-based distributions and in Arch Linux; anywhere Python, GTK and UFW are available.
