= NForce 500 =

Motherboard chipset series

Nvidia nForce 500
- Socket supported: LGA 775; Socket AM2

Miscellaneous
- Release date(s): May 23, 2006
- Predecessor: nForce4
- Successor: nForce 600

The nForce 500 is a motherboard chipset series and the successor to the nForce4 series. It was revealed by NVIDIA on 2006-03-07 and released on May 23, 2006. The nForce 500 series supports AMD's Socket AM2 and support for Intel's LGA 775 has also been added.

== Specifications ==
- Support for NVIDIA SLI technology, including Quad SLI (enabling the simultaneous use of four GPUs) and SLI LinkBoost developments.
- Support for up to six SATA 3 Gbit/s hard disks and ten USB 2.0 devices.
- Support for dual RAID 5.

== Chipsets for AMD processors ==
=== nForce 590 SLI MCP ===
- Enthusiast dual GPU segment, with full 16+16 SLI support.
- Uses the C51XE northbridge and MCP55XE southbridge. The two chips provide a total of 46 PCI Express lanes.

=== nForce 570 SLI ===
- Performance dual GPU segment.
- Total of 28 PCI Express lanes.

=== nForce 570 LT SLI ===
- Performance dual GPU segment.
- Total of 20 PCI Express lanes.

=== nForce 570 Ultra ===
- Performance single GPU segment, lacking SLI support.
- Total of 20 PCI Express lanes.

=== nForce 560 SLI ===
- Performance dual GPU segment, featuring only one Ethernet and four SATA ports.
- Total of 20 PCI Express lanes.

=== nForce 560 ===
- Mainstream single GPU segment, lacking SLI support, and featuring only one Ethernet and four SATA ports.
- Total of 19 PCI Express lanes.

=== nForce 550 ===
- Mainstream single GPU segment, lacking SLI and RAID 5 support, and featuring only one Ethernet and four SATA ports.
- Total of 20 PCI Express lanes.

=== nForce 520 ===
- Value/Mainstream single GPU segment, lacking SLI and RAID 5 support, and featuring only one 10/100 Ethernet and four SATA ports.
- Total of 20 PCI Express lanes.
- Uses MCP65S northbridge.

=== nForce 520 LE ===
- Value single GPU segment, lacking SLI, RAID 0+1 and RAID 5 support, and featuring only one 10/100 Ethernet, 8USB ports two SATA ports.
- Total of 20 PCI Express lanes.

=== nForce 500 SLI (nForce4 SLI AM2) ===
- Performance dual GPU segment.
- Total of 20 PCI Express lanes.

=== nForce 500 Ultra (nForce4 Ultra AM2) ===
- Performance single GPU segment.
- Total of 20 PCI Express lanes.

=== nForce 500 (nForce4 AM2) ===
- Value single GPU segment.
- Total of 20 PCI Express lanes.

== Chipsets for Intel processors ==
=== nForce 590 SLI ===
- Enthusiast dual GPU segment, with full x16 + x16 SLI support.
- Total of 48 PCI Express lanes.

=== nForce 570 SLI ===
- Performance dual GPU segment, with x8 + x8 SLI support.
- Total of 20 PCI Express lanes.

== See also ==
- Comparison of Nvidia chipsets
