= NForce4 =

Motherboard chipset

Nvidia nForce4
- CPU supported: AMD64; Pentium 4
- Socket supported: Socket 939; Socket AM2; Socket 754; LGA 775

Miscellaneous
- Release date: October 2004
- Predecessor: nForce3
- Successor: nForce 500

The nForce4 is a motherboard chipset released by Nvidia in October 2004. The chipset supports AMD 64-bit processors (Socket 939, Socket AM2 and Socket 754) and Intel Pentium 4 LGA 775 processors.

== Models ==
=== nForce4/nForce4-4x ===
nForce4 is the second evolution of the Media Communications Processor (MCP) and incorporates both Northbridge and Southbridge on a single die (the first was nForce3).

The Socket 754 version of the board has the HyperTransport link clocked to 800 MHz (6.4 GB/s transfer rate). Motherboards based on early revisions are mostly referred to as "nForce4-4x" (relating with their ability to handle HT speeds of 4x).

- Support for up to 20 PCI Express (PCIe) lanes (up to 38-40 lanes for the nForce4 SLI x16). Reference boards are set up with one x16 slot and three x1 slots, leaving 1 lane unused.
- Support for up to 10 USB 2.0 ports.
- Support for 4 SATA and 4 PATA drives, which can be linked together in any combination of SATA and PATA to form a RAID 0, 1, or 0+1.
- Nvidia RAID Morphing, which allows conversion from one RAID type to another on the fly.
- Nvidia nTune, a tool for easy overclocking and timing configurations.
- Full 1000 MHz speed on HyperTransport (8 GB/s transfer rate).
- Eight-channel AC'97 audio.
- Onboard Gigabit Ethernet.
- Nvidia ActiveArmor, an onboard firewall solution. (Not available on regular nForce 4)
- Does not support Windows 98 or Windows Me.

=== nForce4 Ultra ===
The Ultra version contains all of the features of the nForce4-4x version with the addition of:

- Hardware processing for the ActiveArmor to reduce CPU load.
- Serial ATA 3 Gbit/s interface with 300 MB/s transfer speeds for SATA 3 Gbit/s drives.

Enthusiasts discovered early after the release of nForce4 Ultra that the chipset was identical to nForce4 SLI other than a single resistor on the chip package itself. By modifying this resistor as the SLI is configured, an Ultra can be turned into an SLI.

=== nForce4 SLI ===
The SLI version has all the features of the Ultra version, in addition to SLI (Scalable Link Interface). This interface allows two video cards to be connected to produce a single output. This can theoretically double framerates by splitting work between the two GPUs.

On a standard (non x16) nForce4 SLI motherboard, the system can be configured to provide an x16 slot for one graphics board or twin x8 slots for the SLI configuration. A jumper bank must be altered to set these options.

=== nForce4 SLI Intel Edition ===
Unlike its AMD Athlon 64 sibling, the Intel Edition is an older chipset as it has both a northbridge and southbridge. As with the older nForce2 chipsets, Nvidia calls the northbridge the "System Platform Processor" (SPP) and the southbridge the "Media and Communications Processor" (MCP). This change in design was necessitated because, unlike the Athlon 64/Opteron, the Pentium 4 does not have an on-board memory controller thus requiring Nvidia to include one in the chipset like in older nForce2. In addition to supporting Pentium 4 processors (with up to a 1066 MHz FSB) the chipset includes support for DDR2 SDRAM. Also like Nvidia's older chipsets, the MCP and SPP communicate through a Hypertransport link, in this case only at (1.6 GB/s. transfer rate) Apart from these differences, the nForce4 SLI Intel Edition shares the same features as the regular nForce4 SLI.

An oddity of the Intel Edition is the fact that while it works with the Pentium D 830 (3.0 GHz) and 840 (3.2 GHz), as well as the Extreme Edition of the 840, it does not work with the Pentium D 820 (2.8 GHz) because the 820 has a much lower current draw than the 830 and 840. Attempting to boot an Intel Edition board with an 820 will cause it to shut down so as to avoid damaging the processor. Nvidia have stated that they do not consider the 820 to be an enthusiast (because it is older) processor, and as such will not be enabling support for it. However, the nForce4 SLI X16 supports it.

=== nForce4 SLI x16 ===
The nForce4 SLI x16 has similar features to the nForce4 SLI, except it now provides 16 PCI-Express lanes to both graphics cards in an SLI configuration (as opposed to only 8 lanes per graphics card with the original SLI chipset). This is the only version of the nForce4 for AMD processors that has a separate northbridge and southbridge. It comprises the existing nForce4 MCP for the southbridge and a new AMD nForce4 System Platform Processor (SPP). The two chips are connected via the HyperTransport link. This solution provides 38 PCI-Express lanes in total, and can be divided over 7 slots. It is also available for Intel processors, whereby it provides 40 PCI-Express lanes, which can be divided over 9 slots.

== Southbridges ==
=== nForce400/405/410/430 ===
The nForce400/405/410/430 refer to nForce4 based southbridges which are used together with GeForce 6100/6150 series northbridges to form a chipset with integrated graphics. The combination is a follow-up to the popular nForce2 IGP chipset.

== Driver Availability ==
Nvidia offers nForce4 chipset driver downloads for NT-based Windows versions from 2000 up to and including Vista in the "Legacy" product type category on their download page. However, there is no official support for Windows 7 or newer, but Windows 7 has a built-in driver for the nForce 6 chipset, which is very similar.

== Flaws ==
Nvidia's nForce4 chipset suffers from several unresolved issues.

The ActiveArmor hardware firewall is nearly non-functional, with many unsolved bugs and potentially serious instability issues. Installing ActiveArmor can cause BSODs for users of certain software, especially peer-to-peer file sharing applications. Some programs, such as μTorrent, go so far as to have warning messages about using Nvidia's firewall in combination with their software. ActiveArmor also has a high probability of causing corruption of file downloads. Nvidia has been unable to solve these issues and points to hardware bugs within the chipset itself, problems which they are unable to work around.

There have also been data corruption issues associated with certain SATA 3 Gbit/s hard drives. The issues can often be resolved with a firmware update for the hard drive from the manufacturer.

The nForce4 chipset has also been blamed for issues with PCI cards, relating to Nvidia's implementation of the PCI bus. RME Audio, a maker of professional audio equipment, has stated that the latency of the PCI bus is unreliable and that the chipset's PCI Express interface can "hog" system data transfer resources when intense video card usage is occurring. This has the effect of causing audible pops and clicks with PCI sound cards. Gamers have noticed this effect, especially with Creative's Sound Blaster X-Fi and Sound Blaster Audigy 2 sound cards. Compatibility issues between these sound cards and nForce4 motherboards have been ongoing, including reports of serious and irreversible damage to crucial motherboard components. Driver updates were also found to be unsuccessful. Latency issues are more readily apparent with sound cards than other addon cards because of the direct user feedback the audio problems demonstrate.

== See also ==
- Comparison of Nvidia chipsets
- NForce 500
