= Xbox technical specifications =

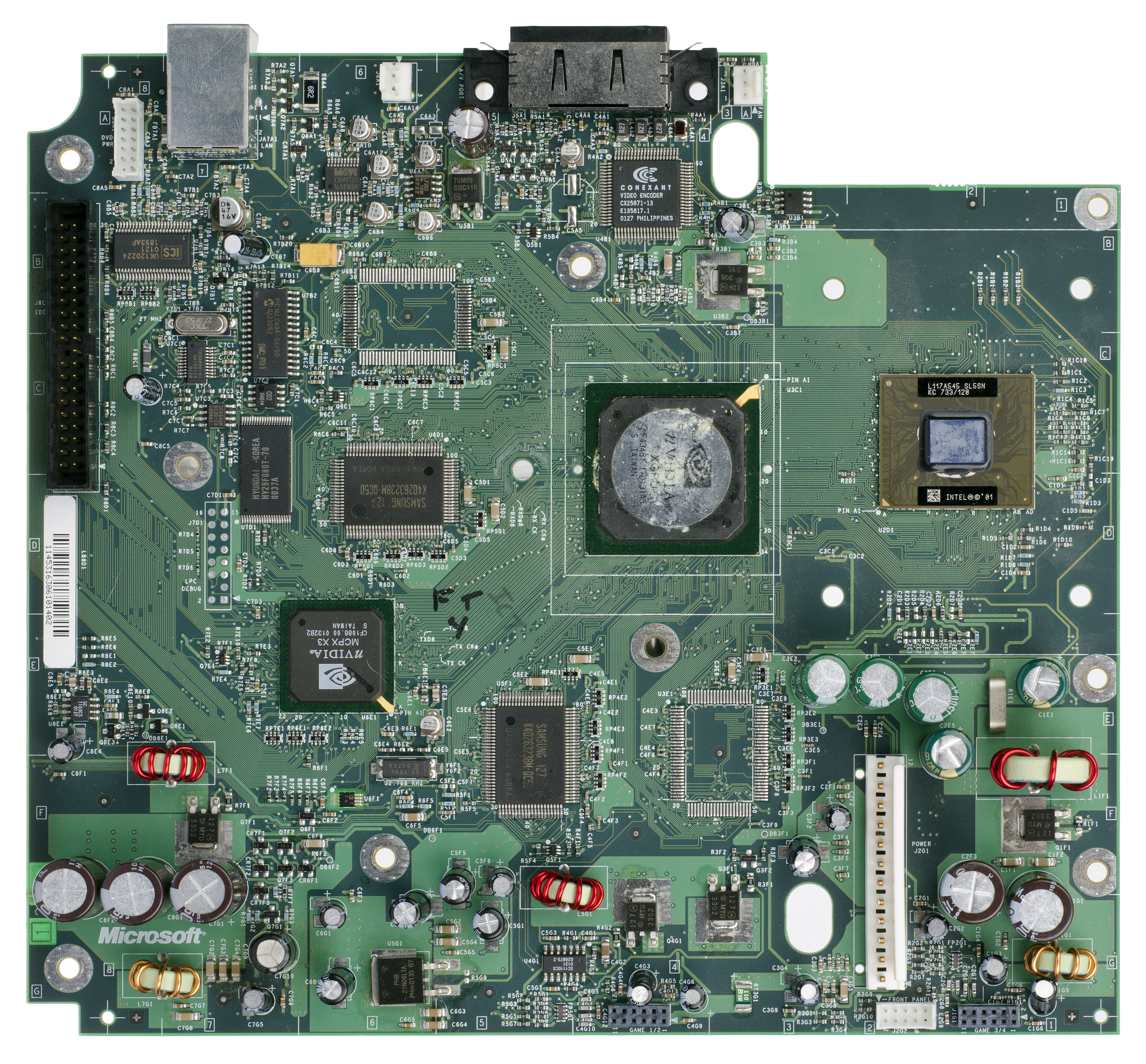
The Xbox motherboard

The Xbox technical specifications describe the various components of the Xbox video game console.

== Central processing unit ==
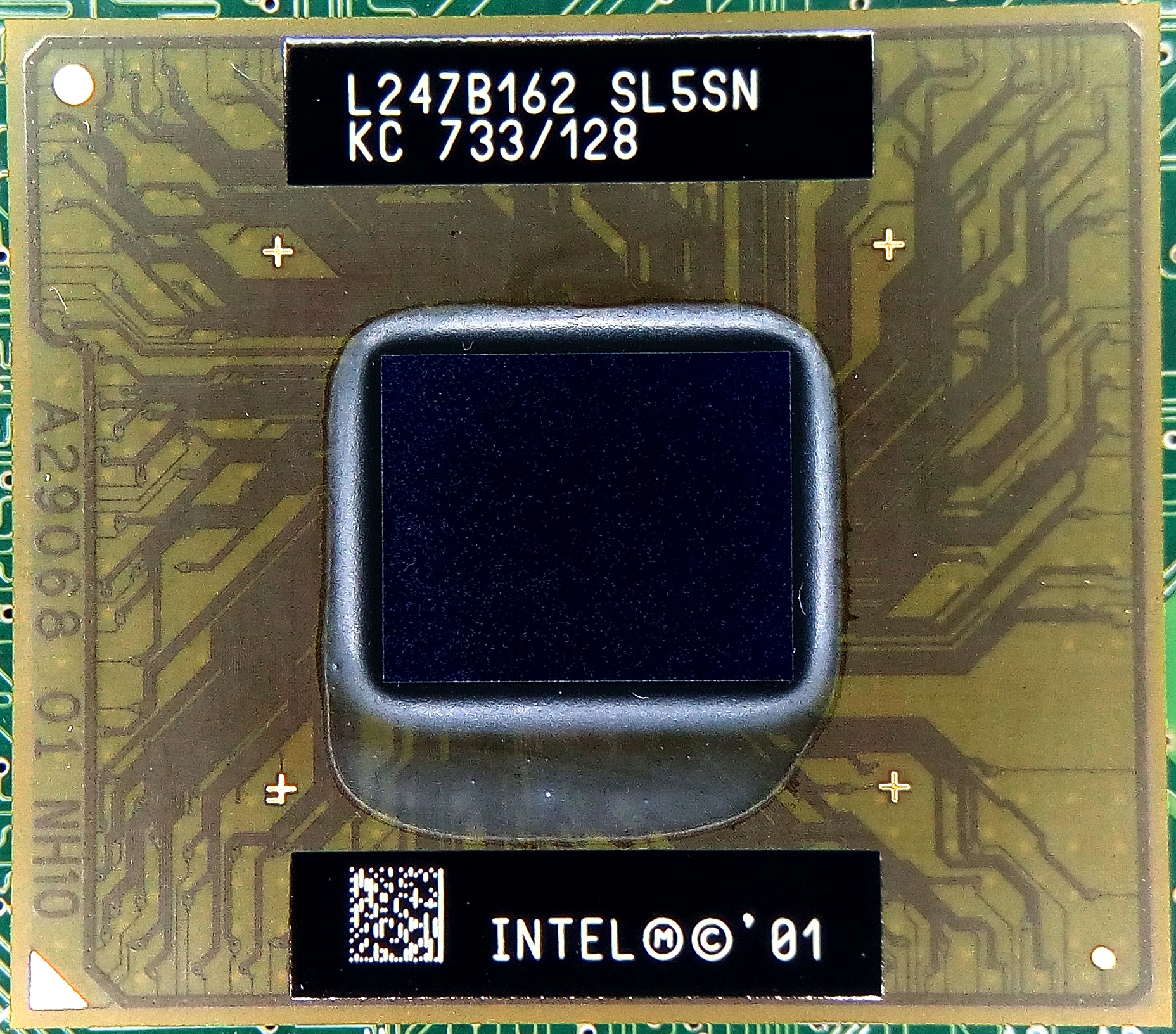
Xbox CPU

- CPU: 32-bit 733 MHz, custom Intel Pentium III Coppermine-based processor in a Micro-PGA2 package (though soldered to the mainboard using BGA). 180 nm process.
  - 133 MHz 64-bit GTL+ front-side bus (FSB) to GPU (1.06 GB/s bandwidth)
  - 32KB L1 cache. 128 KB on-die L2 cache
  - SSE floating point SIMD. Four single-precision floating point numbers per clock cycle.
  - MMX integer SIMD

== Memory ==
- Shared graphics memory sub-system
  - 64 MB DDR SDRAM at 200 MHz; in dual-channel 128-bit configuration giving 6400 MB/s (6.4 GB/s)
    - Maximum of 1.06 GB/s bandwidth accessible by CPU FSB
    - Theoretical 5.34 GB/s bandwidth shared by rest of the system
  - Supplied by Hynix or Samsung depending on manufacture date and location

== Graphics processing unit ==
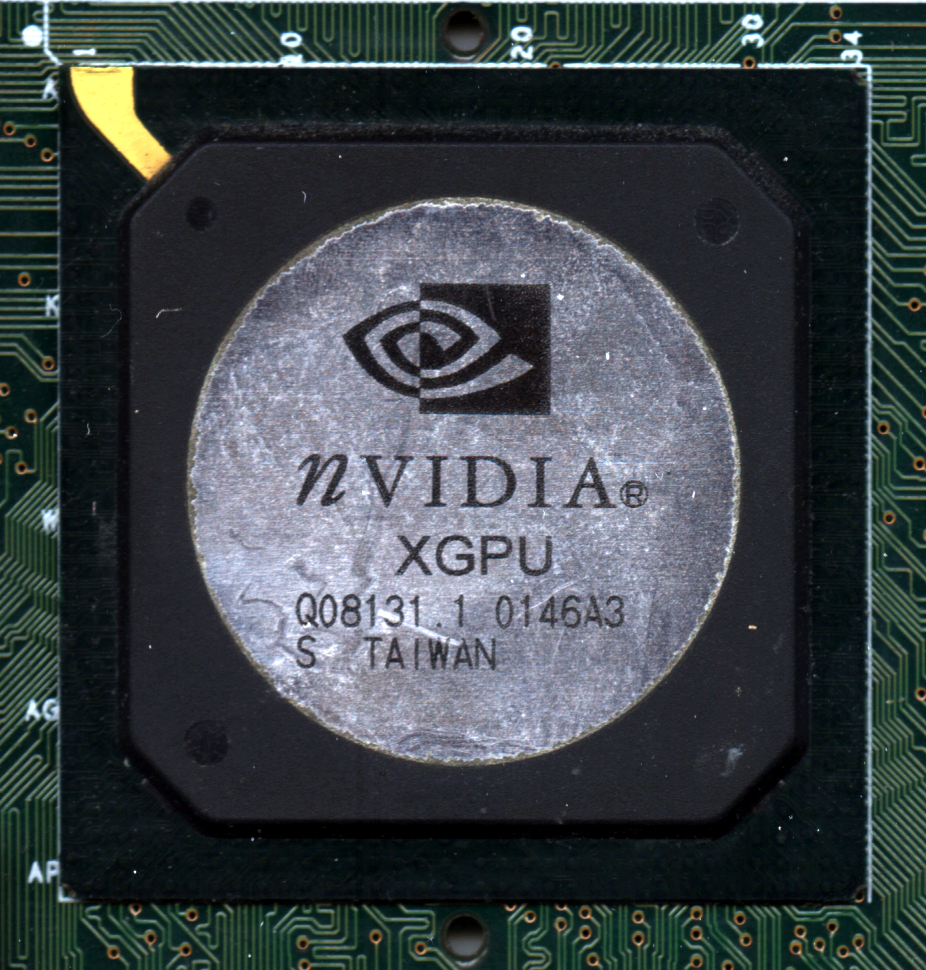
The XGPU

- GPU and system chipset: 233 MHz "NV2A" ASIC. Co-developed by Microsoft and Nvidia and essentially a variant of Geforce 3 chips.
  - Geometry engine: 115 million vertices per second, 125 million particles per second (peak)
  - 4 pixel pipelines with 2 texture units each
  - Peak fillrate:
    - Rendering fillrate: 932 megapixels per second (233 MHz × 4 pipelines)
    - Texture fillrate: 1,864 megatexels per second (932 MP × 2 texture units)
  - Realistic fillrate:
    - Rendering fillrate: 250–700 megapixels per second, with Z-buffering, fogging, alpha blending and texture mapping
    - Texture fillrate: 500–1400 megatexels per second (250-700 MP × 2 texture units)
  - Peak triangle performance: 29,125,000 32-pixel triangles per second, raw or with 2 textures and lighting (32-pixel divided from peak fillrate)
    - 485,416 triangles per frame at 60 frames per second
    - 970,833 triangles per frame at 30 frames per second
  - Realistic triangle performance: 7,812,500–21,875,000 32-pixel triangles per second, with 2 textures, lighting, Z-buffering, fogging and alpha blending (32-pixel divided from realistic fillrate)
    - 130,208–364,583 triangles per frame at 60 frames per second
    - 260,416–729,166 triangles per frame at 30 frames per second
  - 4 textures per pass, texture compression, full scene anti-aliasing (NV Quincunx, supersampling, multisampling)
  - Bilinear, trilinear, and anisotropic texture filtering
  - Performance lies between a Geforce 3 Series GPU and a Geforce 4 Series GPU. This is due to the added vertex shader present on the ASIC, thus doubling the vertex output compared to Geforce 3 ASICs. Clock speed is the same as the original Geforce 3 series GPU (233 MHz) thus slower than Geforce 4 series starting at 250 MHz.

== Storage ==
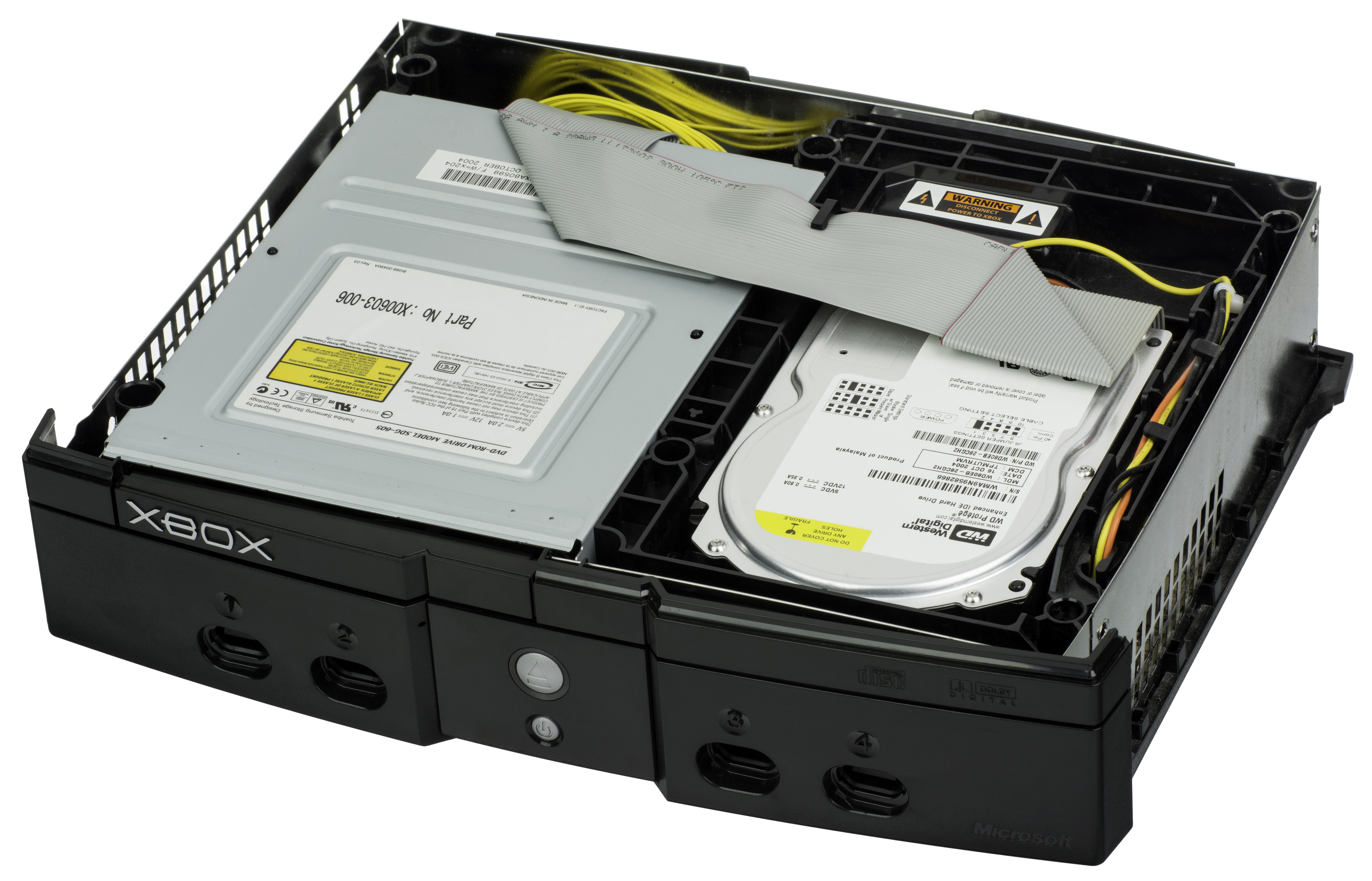
The top of the Xbox, disassembled. It uses a standard DVD-ROM and Hard-disk drive via Parallel ATA.

- Storage media
  - 2×–5× (2.6 MB/s–6.6 MB/s) CAV DVD-ROM
  - 8 or 10 GB, 3.5 in, 5,400 RPM hard disk formatted to 8 GB with FATX file system
  - Optional 8 MB memory card for saved game file transfer

== Audio ==
- Audio processor: NVIDIA "MCPX" (a.k.a. SoundStorm "NVAPU")
  - Wolfson Microelectronics XWM9709 AC97 Revision 2.1 Audio Codec
  - Integrated Parthus DSP for realtime Dolby Digital encoding
  - 64 3D sound channels (up to 256 stereo voices)
  - HRTF Sensaura 3D enhancement
  - MIDI DLS2 Support
  - Monaural, Stereo, Dolby Surround, Dolby Digital Live 5.1, and DTS Surround (DVD movies only) audio output options

== Connectivity ==
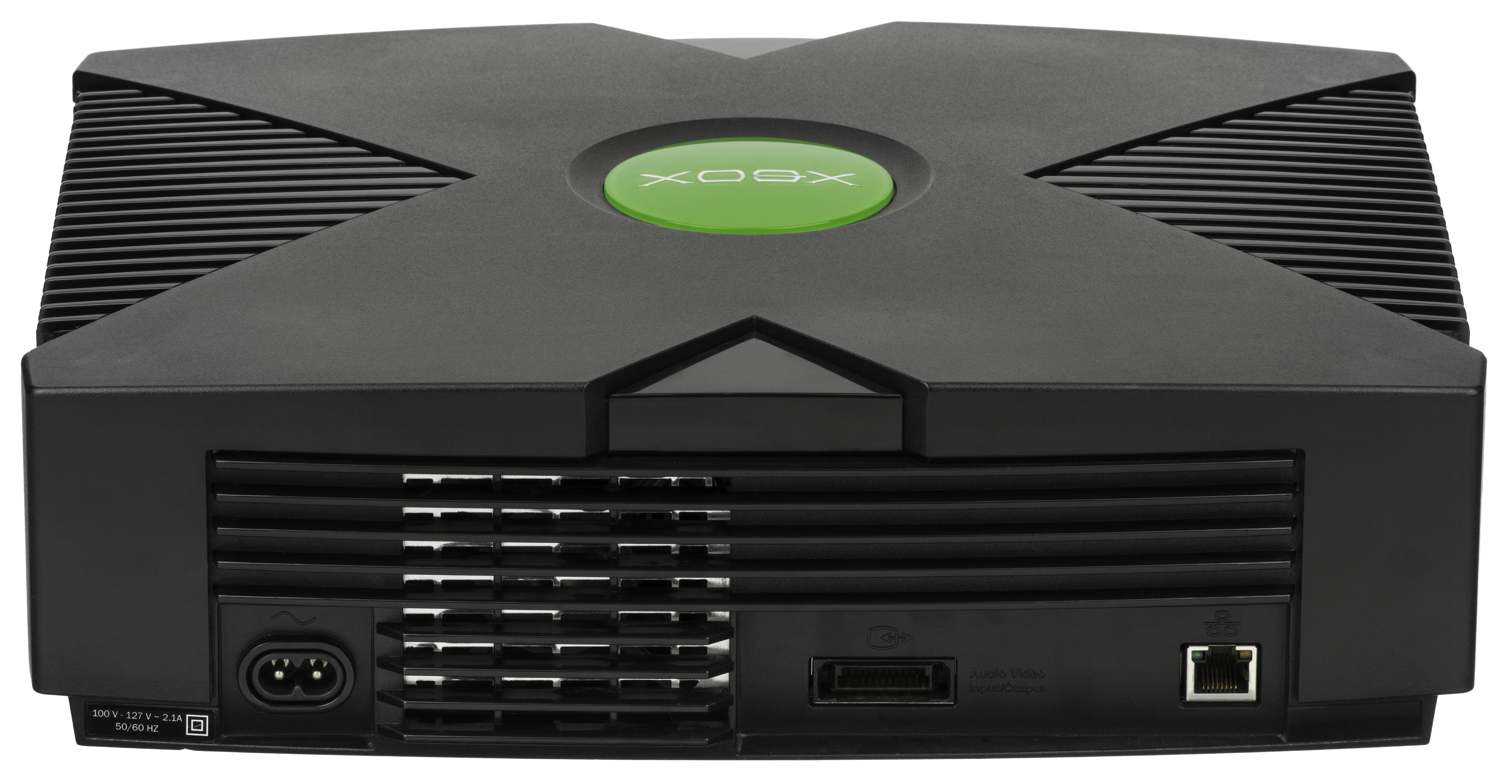
The Xbox has a standard AC in, A/V connector and Ethernet port.

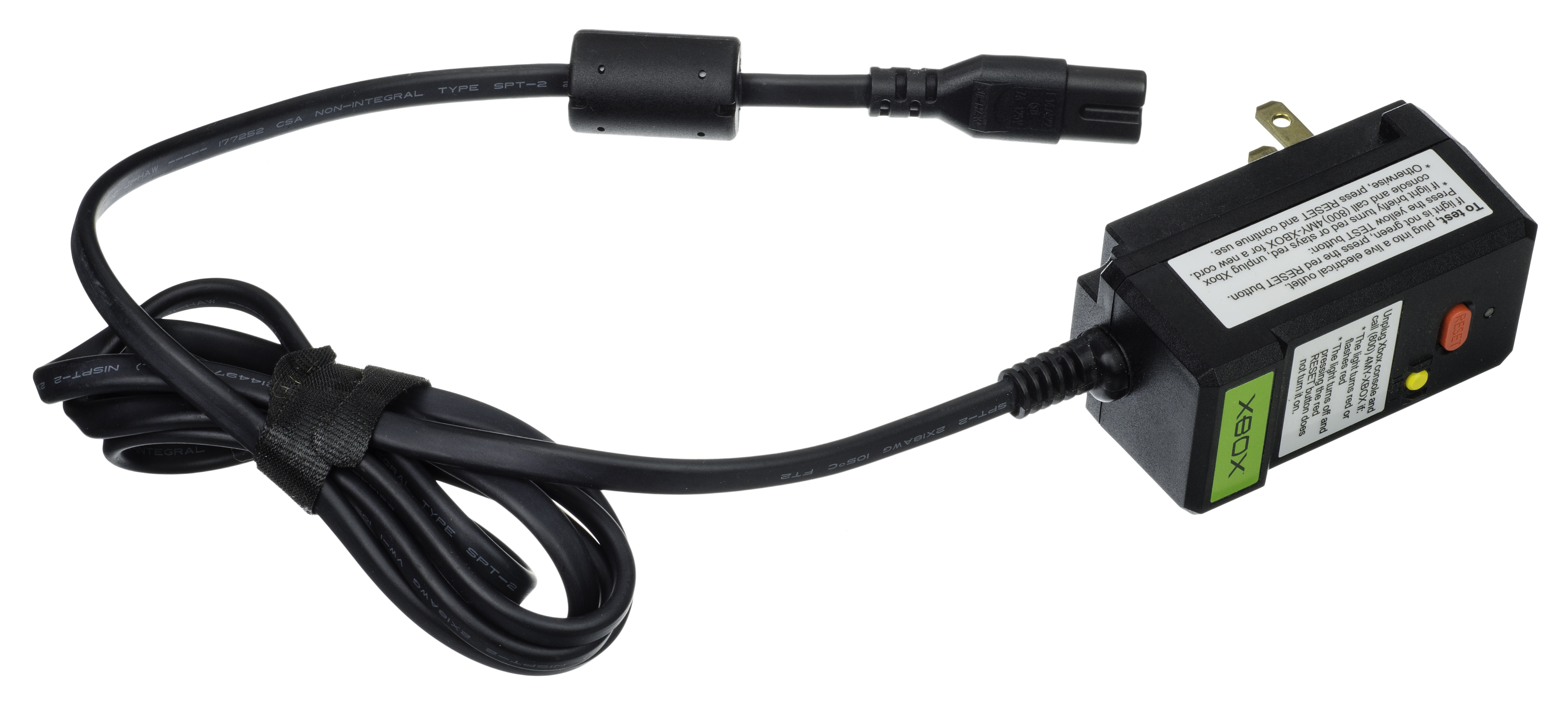
The Xbox power cord.

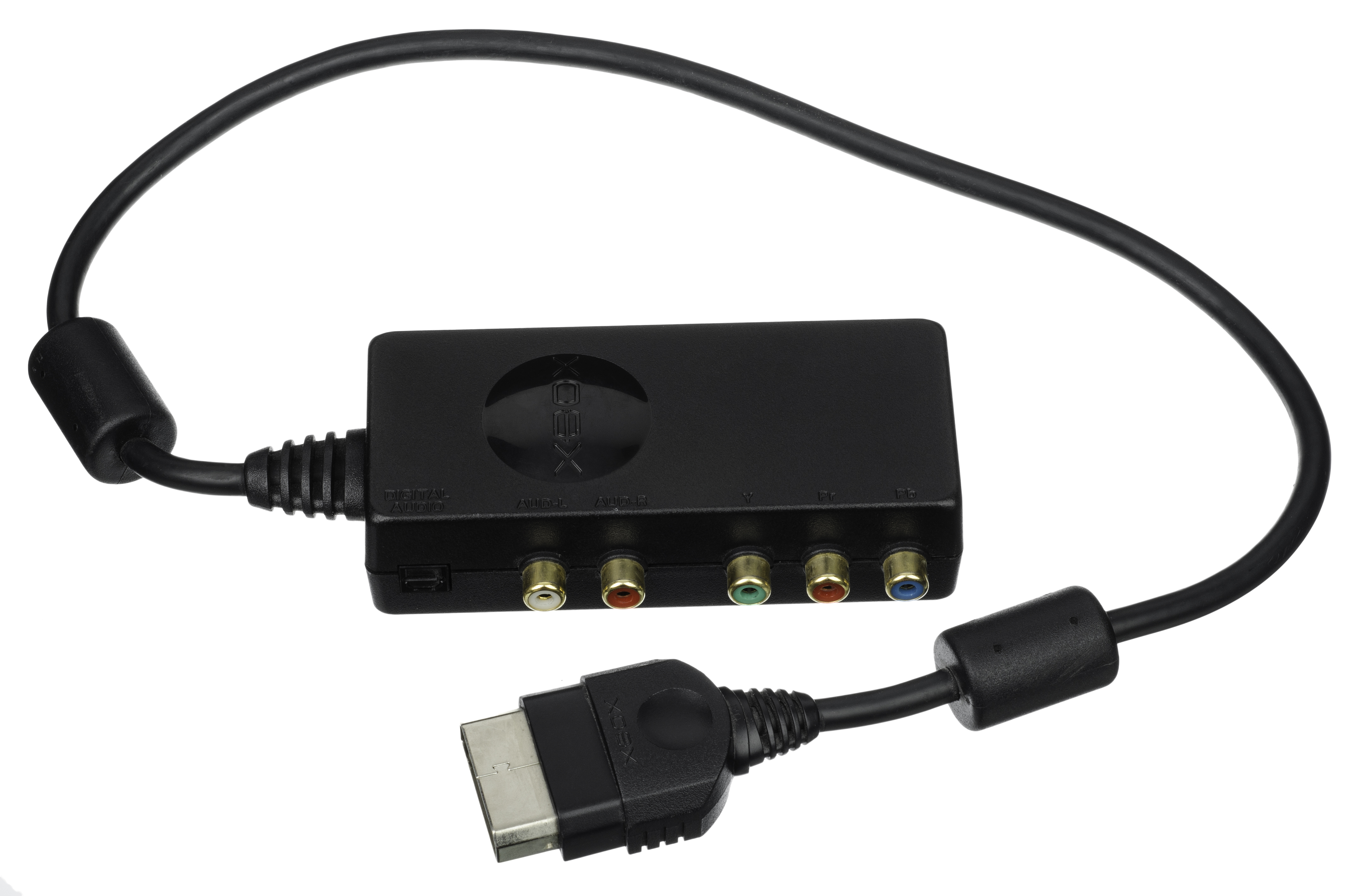
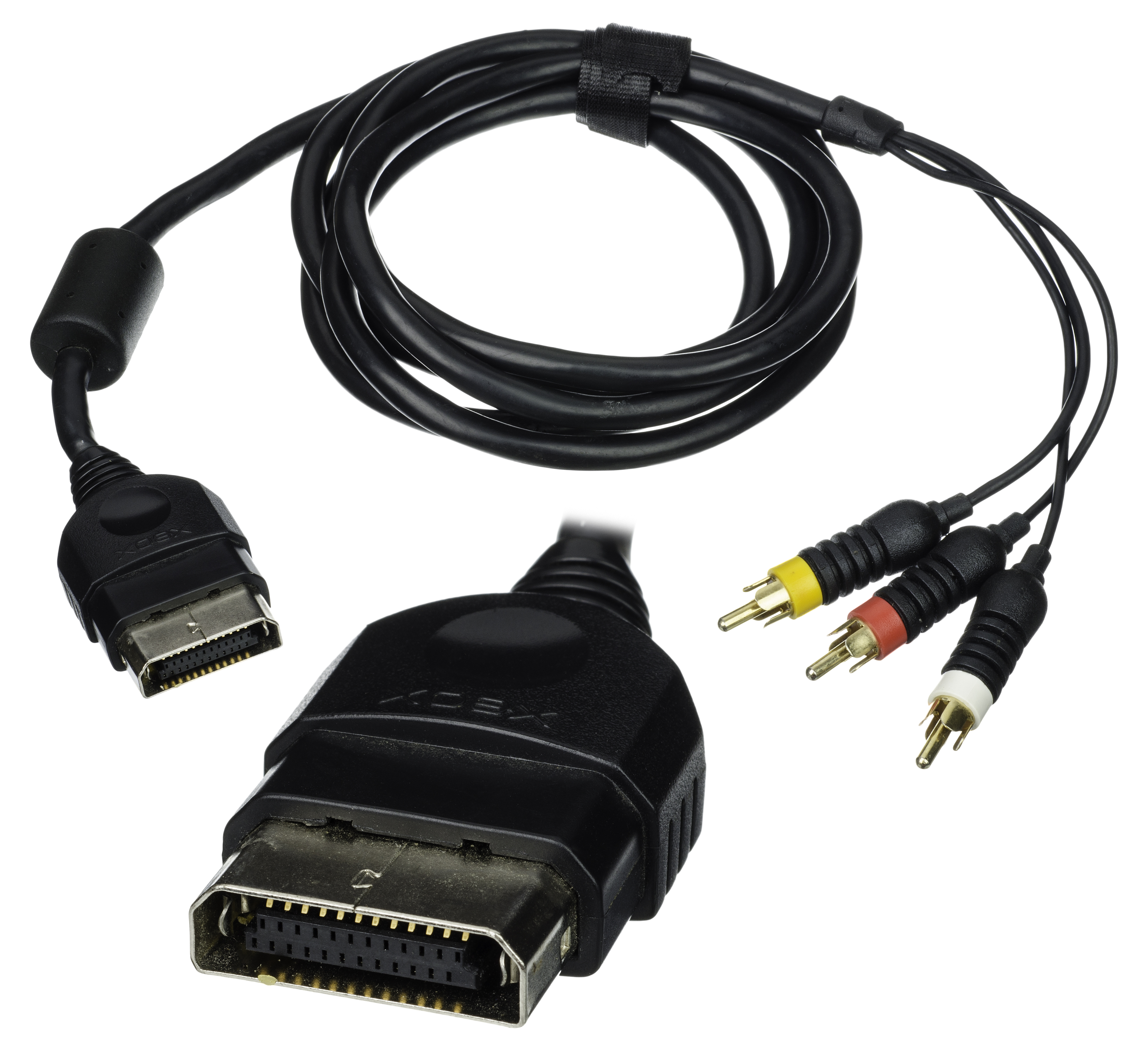
Left: "High Definition AV Pack"; right: Composite A/V Cable
- Controller ports: 4 proprietary USB 1.1 ports
- A/V outputs: composite video, S-Video, component video, HDMI (via 3rd party), SCART, Digital Optical TOSLINK, and stereo RCA analog audio
  - S-Video requires "Advanced AV Pack", component video requires "High Definition AV Pack", TOSLINK requires either of the two
- Resolutions: 480i, 480p, 576i, 576p, 720p, 1080i
- Integrated 10/100BASE-TX wired Ethernet with ICS ICS1893AF Physical Layer Transceiver
- DVD movie playback (add-on required)

== Physical specifications ==
- Weight: 3.86 kg (8.5 lb)
- Dimensions: 320 × 100 × 260 mm (12.5 × 4 × 10.5 in)

== See also ==
- nVIDIA nForce
