= SoundStorm =

Nvidia brand for surround sound technology on chipsets

NVIDIA SoundStorm
- Design firm: Nvidia
- Type: Chipsets
- Processor: nForce/nForce2

SoundStorm is a brand by Nvidia referring to a SIP block integrating 5.1 surround sound technology found on the die of their nForce and nForce2 chipsets for x86 CPUs. It is also the name of a certification to be obtained from Nvidia when complying with their specifications.

== Certification ==
The SoundStorm certification ensured that many manufacturers produced solutions with high quality sound output. To achieve SoundStorm certification, a motherboard had to use the nForce or nForce2 chipsets and also include the specified discrete outputs. It was also necessary to meet certain sound quality levels as tested by Dolby Digital sound labs.

At the time SoundStorm was the only available solution capable of outputting Dolby Digital Live, coveted in home theater PCs.

== Hardware ==
The SoundStorm SIP block is said to consist of a series of fixed-function and general-purpose processing units. A fully programmable, Motorola 56300-based digital signal processor (DSP) is provided for effects processing but with very limited support under DirectX on the PC.

The DSP on the APU was normally driven by code largely derived from the 3D audio middleware company Sensaura. The Sensaura middleware was also used by the Windows drivers of nearly every sound card and audio codec other than those by Creative. Unlike the usual software implementations of the Sensaura code, the SoundStorm solution ran the same code on a hardware DSP, which resulted in extremely low CPU usage. It was also capable of real-time Dolby Digital 5.1 encoding. Compared to other audio solutions of the day, the difference in CPU usage when running popular multimedia applications was as much as 10-20%. While the Audigy offers similar performance, it does so at a much higher price point, and only as a discrete add-in solution.

The nForce2 APU was a purely digital component, with motherboard manufacturers still having to use codec chips such as the 650 from Realtek for the audio output functions, and to do the necessary digital to analog conversion (DAC). After the discontinuation of SoundStorm, codec chips such as the Realtek 850 have become standard integrated audio solutions, with audio processing functions offloaded onto the host processor. As such, the quality of the device drivers is important to ensure reasonably low host processor usage, without audio quality issues.

== Drivers ==
Since the SoundStorm solution was a general-purpose DSP where code was uploaded to the card by the device drivers at boot time, this made it easy to add new functionality. However, it also had implications of preventing third-party device drivers for the SoundStorm, since they did not have access to the DSP code. Linux drivers for the SoundStorm actually talk directly to the audio codec (like a RealTek ALC650), bypassing the APU completely and doing all audio calculations on the CPU and leaving the SoundStorm DSP idle.

== History ==
=== Video game consoles ===
Reportedly, SoundStorm development was originally funded by Microsoft for use in the Xbox gaming console. At the time of writing reportedly a second generation chip had been developed, this time with funding from Sony, as part of the PlayStation 3 project. It was hinted that SoundStorm may make return to the PC scene, possibly as part of a multimedia graphics card, along the lines of the original NV1 card, rather than as a discrete or onboard solution. While there did appear to be plans for a discrete product at one point, this never materialised.

=== Discontinuation ===
Nvidia decided the cost of including the SoundStorm SIP block on the dies of their chipsets was too high and was not included in nForce3 and beyond.

== Alternatives ==
Other manufacturers have since produced standalone sound cards based on C-Media chips such as the CMI8788 which also provide Dolby Digital and DTS encoding features. These manufacturers include Turtle Beach and Auzentech. A software alternative is redocneXk, which provides real-time AC3 encoding comparable to SoundStorm or Creative's Audigy2 and later sound cards.

In October 2013 AMD presented products with AMD TrueAudio. A block of DSPs to be used to offload calculations for 3D sound.

== See also ==
- Comparison of Nvidia chipsets
- AMD TrueAudio
