= XDNA (multi-graphics) =

The xDNA technology is a technology designed by Diamond Multimedia, allowing motherboards which are not certified for ATI CrossFire (for instance, nForce 500/600 series motherboards designed by Nvidia) to install multiple ATI Radeon video cards (up to four) as a CrossFire setup and operate in rendering modes which are exclusively made for CrossFire setups. Diamond Multimedia will provide optimized Catalyst drivers and middleware for the platform in a single package.

== See also ==
- SLI
