= NForce3 =

Chipset by Nvidia

Nvidia nForce3
- CPU supported: AMD64; Sempron
- Socket supported: Socket 939; Socket AM2; Socket 754; LGA 775

Miscellaneous
- Predecessor: nForce2
- Successor: nForce4

The nForce3 chipset was created by Nvidia as a Media and Communications Processor. Specifically, it was designed for use with the Athlon 64 processor.

== Features of the nForce3 ==
When the Athlon 64 was launched, the Nvidia nForce3 Pro150 and VIA K8T800 were the only two chipsets available. The 150 chipset was widely criticized at launch for using a 600 MHz HyperTransport interface, when VIA had implemented the full AMD specification at 800 MHz, even though overall performance of the 150 was still good.

Later revisions fixed this omission, and using a HyperTransport interface, the nForce3 chipset is able to communicate at up to 8 GB/s with the CPU. This reduces system bottlenecks when using high-bandwidth devices. For example, the Gigabit Ethernet transmits at 125 MB/s; if the Ethernet were not on the chipset, a saturated gigabit Ethernet link would use 93% of the bandwidth of the shared 133 MB/s PCI bus.

The 150 also noticeably lacked features. Subsequent revisions of the chipset corrected these omissions. The chipset is offered in different versions, reflecting socket types and features.

- nForce3 250 - Socket 754, basic value chipset, 800HT, does not include on-chip Gigabit LAN or on-chip Firewall.
- nForce3 250Gb - Socket 754 or 939, 800HT, includes gigabit LAN and on-chip Firewall.
- nForce3 Ultra - Socket 939, 1000HT, gigabit LAN, Firewall, Dual-Channel unbuffered, for Athlon 64/Athlon 64 FX.
- nForce3 Pro250 - Socket 940, 1000HT, gigabit LAN, Firewall, for Opteron.

The 250 revision of the nForce 3 featured the world’s first native Gigabit Ethernet interface and a hardware-optimized Firewall. The Nvidia Firewall technology utilizes the ActiveArmor secure networking engine. This makes the firewall an on-chip function, in theory reducing the overhead on the CPU and increasing throughput. The firewall also uses IAM, or Intelligent Application Manager, to provide application-based filtering.

However, the most notable omission from the nForce 3 chipset is the quality integrated SoundStorm audio found in nForce2 boards, supposedly for cost reasons. The nForce 3 chipset is a single die solution, as opposed to the historical northbridge / southbridge combination, and reportedly there was not enough space left for audio functionality. An alternative explanation has been proposed that the Dolby technology licensing for SoundStorm that Nvidia originally obtained for the chipset of Microsoft's Xbox allowed Nvidia effectively license-free implementation on the contemporary Nforce1 and Nforce2, but implementation on Nforce3 would have required new license payments.

The nForce3 also supports SATA technology, as well as RAID 0+1 striping and mirroring. The chipset can accommodate up to four high bandwidth SATA-150 devices.

== Windows Vista incompatibility ==
Nvidia announced before the public release of Windows Vista that they would not release chipset drivers for the AGP-based nForce2 for the operating system. They subsequently decided to also drop support for nForce3 in late February 2007, after the release of Vista. Nvidia is thus the only major mainboard chipset manufacturer that is not supporting a chipset designed for 64-bit processors with Vista. The chipset drivers packaged with Windows Vista are usable, but as a result of not being specifically designed for the nForce2 and 3 chipsets, they do not take full advantage of the hardware and lose some functionality. One such problem disables safe removal of IDE and SATA drives.

One issue concerning the lack of natively supported drivers for the nForce3 chipset in Windows Vista has come up with the public release of the operating system and the affordability of dual core systems. In these dual core systems with ATI graphics chipsets above the Radeon 9XXX series, Windows Vista disables the ATI display drivers designed for the operating system and defaults to the PCI-compatible drivers. Windows reports this as Code 43 Error. In PCI-compatible mode, all hardware acceleration is switched off, negatively affecting the performance of the display adapter.

With single core processors, this issue does not exist. ATI has claimed Nvidia's chipset driver is the issue. AMD has released announcement about the matter in knowledge base entry #737-24498. SiS, ULi and VIA also had problems with their chipset drivers (mainly agp.inf), but quickly released patches to correct these issues.

In February 2007, Nvidia said that the problem will most likely be resolved with an "MCP driver update."

To date, Nvidia has not released a complete chipset driver package for nForce3 and Windows Vista. However, Nvidia has posted individual 32 bit pre-release networking and audio drivers for Windows Vista Beta 1 that support the nForce3 series (and 64 bit). It is also possible that nForce4 chipsets may experience similar problems with the RAID and ATA drivers.

Even using nforce3 with an Nvidia card causes it to only negotiate AGP 4x not 8x, and causes the system to restart repeatedly. There are however workarounds allowing the use of the Windows XP 32bit nForce3 GART driver under Vista 32bit, allowing use of AGP8x, and providing a more stable system. The method is described in this forum thread.

The same workaround exists for Vista x64 users via the Windows XP 64bit nForce3 Beta GART driver. The driver is located here. This driver is not signed so in order to boot the system, you will have to Disable Driver Signature Enforcement at the boot menu or install Readydriver Plus to do it automatically.

Nvidia offers chipset driver download in the "Legacy" product category on its download page.

== See also ==
- Comparison of Nvidia chipsets
