= GeForce 8000-series chipsets =

Series of Nvidia motherboard chipsets

GeForce 8000 series is a series of Nvidia motherboard chipsets aimed at home theater PC and gaming pc solutions using CPUs by AMD (for its Intel CPUs equivalent see GeForce 9300 or GeForce 9400 chipsets). The chipsets are capable of full 1080p Blu-ray and HD DVD playback with most processing being done by the integrated chipset from the motherboard and not requiring an additional video card.

== Specifications ==
Feature	Description
NVIDIA Hybrid SLI Technology	GeForce Boost technology, HybridPower technology
Graphics	DirectX 10 support, PureVideo HD, 8 stream processors
Display Options	HDMI, Single Link DVI, VGA
Expansion Slots	PCI Express 2.0 support, 1 x16, 3 x1, Up to 5 PCI Slots
CPU	AMD Phenom, Athlon 64 FX, Athlon 64 X2, Athlon 64
CPU socket	Socket AM2+/AM2
Memory	DDR2 1066/800/667/533
Storage	NVIDIA MediaShield Technology, Up to 6 Serial ATA 3.0 Gbit/s drives, Up to 2 PATA drives (Ultra DMA 133/100/66/33), RAID configurations 0, 1, 0+1, 5
Networking	Native Gigabit Ethernet connection, NVIDIA FirstPacket technology
USB	Up to 12 USB 2.0 ports
Audio	VIA / Nvidia High Definition Audio

== Available motherboards ==
Chipset	Manufacturer	Model	Form Factor	Integrated HDMI 1.3	HDCP Key	Other features
GeForce 8100	Zotac	GF8100-A-E	mATX	No	Yes	HDMI by adapter, D-sub, DVI
GeForce 8100	ECS		mATX	No	Yes	HDMI by adapter, D-sub, DVI
GeForce 8200	ASRock	K10N78FullHD-hSLI	mATX	Yes	Yes	HDMI by adapter, D-sub, DVI
GeForce 8200	ASUS	M3N78-EMH HDMI	mATX	Yes	Yes	HDMI, D-sub, DVI
GeForce 8200	Biostar	GF8200 M2+	mATX	No	Yes	D-sub, DVI
GeForce 8200	ECS	GF8200A	ATX	Yes	Yes	HDMI, D-sub
GeForce 8200	EVGA	113-M2-E113-TR	ATX	Yes	Yes	HDMI, D-sub, DVI
GeForce 8200	Gigabyte	GA-M78SM-S2H	mATX	Yes	Yes	HDMI, D-sub, DVI
GeForce 8200	Gigabyte	GA-M85M-US2H	mATX	Yes	Yes	HDMI, D-sub, DVI-D, NVIDIA Core Calibration
GeForce 8200	MSI	K9N2GM-FIH	mATX	Yes	Yes	HDMI, D-sub
GeForce 8200	XFX	MB-N78S-8209	mATX	Yes	Yes	HDMI, D-sub, DVI, NVIDIA Core Calibration
GeForce 8200	XFX	MI-A78S-8209	mATX	Yes	Yes	HDMI, D-sub, DVI, NVIDIA Core Calibration
GeForce 8200	Shuttle Inc.	SN78SH7	SFF	Yes	Yes	HDMI, DVI by adapter
GeForce 8300	ASUS	M3N78 PRO	ATX	Yes	Yes	HDMI, D-sub, DVI by adapter
GeForce 8300	XFX	MI-A78U-8309	mATX	Yes	Yes	HDMI, D-sub, DVI
GeForce 8300	Zotac	GF8300-A-E	mATX	Yes	Yes	HDMI by adapter, D-sub, DVI

== See also ==
- Comparison of Nvidia chipsets
