= ThinkPad T42 =

Computer model by IBM

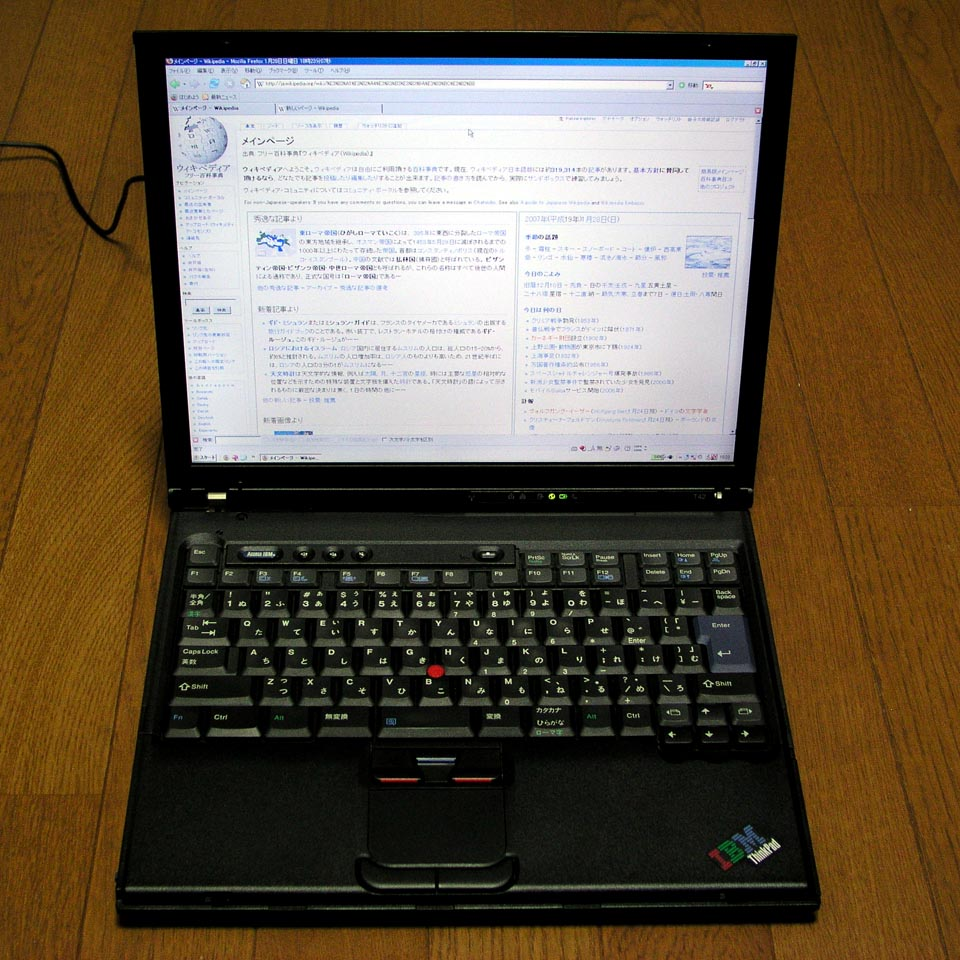
IBM ThinkPad T42

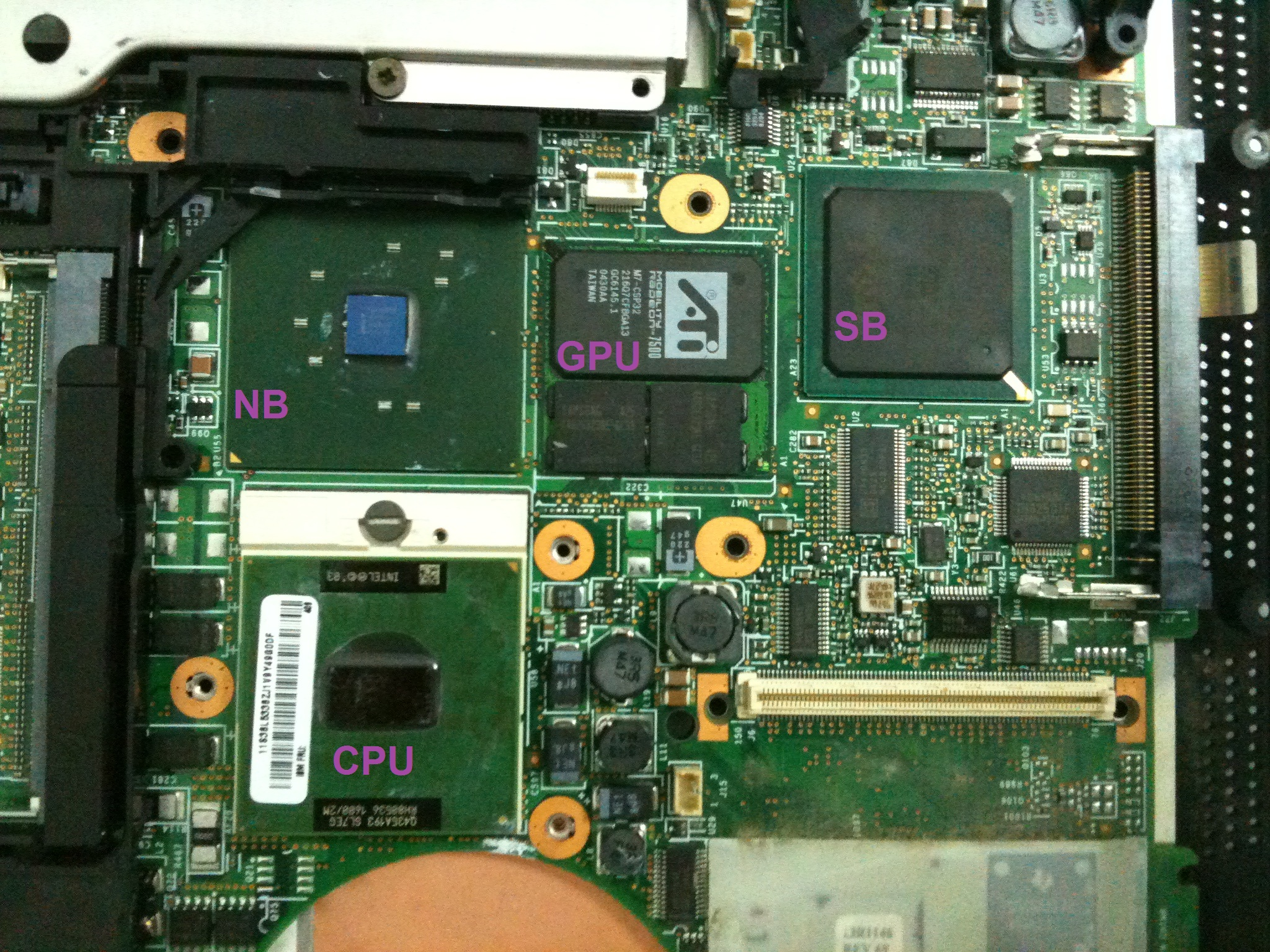
Part of an Thinkpad T42 laptop motherboard showing the CPU, GPU, Northbridge (NB), and Southbridge (SB)

The IBM ThinkPad T42 is a laptop from the ThinkPad line that was manufactured by IBM.
