= NForce =

Motherboard chipset

Nvidia nForce

Miscellaneous
- Release date: 2001
- Successor: nForce2

nForce is a motherboard chipset created by Nvidia originally for AMD Athlon and Duron, with later revisions also supporting contemporary Intel processors. The chipset shipped in 3 varieties; 220, 415, and 420. 220 and 420 are very similar with each having the integrated GPU, but the 220 only has a single channel of memory available whereas 420 has the 128-bit TwinBank design. The 415 variant again has the dual-channel memory interface, but has no integrated graphics.

The original nForce is the first chipset in the series, to which the brand was used until Nvidia left the motherboard chipset business in 2009.

== Innovations ==
=== Dual channel & GeForce2 MX IGP ===
The nForce chipset introduced a dual-channel memory controller to the mainstream motherboard market, doubling theoretical throughput, and offering very competitive performance most especially in workstation class benchmarks. This dual-channel design was deemed necessary largely because of the added integrated GeForce 2 MX class video hardware. For the relatively fast integrated graphics processor (IGP) to have adequate memory bandwidth it needed more than to simply share a single memory channel with the Athlon XP CPU.

=== Ethernet and DASP ===
Nvidia also touted both their built-in Ethernet controller, and a new memory prefetch mechanism called the Dynamic Adaptive Speculative Pre-Processor (DASP). The Nvidia-built Ethernet controller was supposedly capable of reducing CPU overhead while being also very fast. The DASP unit helped reduce memory latency for the main CPU by prefetching often needed data, or data that the DASP predicted the CPU would need. Many considered it somewhat an advanced Level 3 cache device.

=== nForce APU (SoundStorm) ===
Nvidia debuted their advanced NVAPU audio solution, branded SoundStorm, on the nForce MCP-D southbridge chip. It is the same as the audio processor in the Xbox chipset and supports many hardware-accelerated 2D/3D audio channels and advanced HRTF 3D audio spatialization provided largely by Sensaura. It also has a built-in processor for encoding computer audio into a Dolby Digital Live signal for external receivers to decode into a 5.1-channel audio spread. With its hardware acceleration, the difference in CPU usage when running popular multimedia applications was as much as 10-20%, potentially allowing faster performance in programs that are limited by the system CPU.

== Performance and problems ==
The original nForce chipset was let down by patchy driver support and less than optimal hardware design. Performance of the dual-channel memory controller and "DASP" did not greatly surpass the VIA Technologies KT266A chipset that was usually as fast and cheaper. The optimized parallel ATA driver support was introduced and then withdrawn after hardware incompatibilities showed up, and the much heralded SoundStorm audio was seen to crackle under heavily loaded scenarios. In fact, the ATA driver would remain an issue at least into the life of nForce4 where it was still known to cause problems with some hard drives and optical drives.

== See also ==
- Comparison of Nvidia chipsets
- Xbox technical specifications
