= Comparison of Nvidia nForce chipsets =

List of chipsets created by Nvidia

This is a comparison of chipsets designed by Nvidia. Nvidia stopped producing chipsets in 2009. Nvidia codenames its chipsets MCPs (Media and Communications Processors).

== nForce ==
=== nForce ===
Model	Release date	Processors Supported	Fabrication process (nm)	FSB/HT Frequency (MHz)	Memory	Max. memory	AGP	Southbridge	Integrated Graphics	Notes
nForce 220(-D)	Q2 2001	Athlon XP, Athlon, Duron		266 MHz, 200 MHz	DDR266 single channel	1.5 GB	AGP 4×	MCP; MCP-D	Geforce 2 MX IGP	Models ending -D use the MCP-D southbridge
nForce 420(-D)	Q2 2001	Athlon XP, Athlon, Duron		266 MHz, 200 MHz	DDR266 dual channel	1.5 GB	AGP 4×	MCP; MCP-D	Geforce 2 MX IGP	Models ending -D use the MCP-D southbridge
nForce 415(-D)	Q1 2002	Athlon XP, Athlon, Duron		266 MHz, 200 MHz	DDR266 dual channel	1.5 GB	AGP 4×	MCP; MCP-D	No	Models ending -D use the MCP-D southbridge

=== nForce Southbridges ===
Model	Release date	Fabrication process (nm)	PCI	USB	FireWire (IEEE1394)	PATA	SATA	LAN	Sound	Features	Notes
MCP	2001		5 Ports	6 Ports Rev 1.1	No	2 Ports UDMA 100	No	100 Mbit/s	AC'97 2.1		
MCP-D	2001		5 Ports	6 Ports Rev 1.1	No	2 Ports UDMA 100	No	100 Mbit/s	AC'97 2.1; NVAPU SoundStorm		

== nForce2 ==
=== nForce2 ===
Model	Release date	Processors Supported	Fabrication process (nm)	FSB/HT Frequency (MHz)	Memory	Max. memory	AGP	Southbridge	Features	Notes
nForce2 SPP	2002	Athlon XP, Athlon, Sempron, Duron		333 MHz, 266 MHz, 200 MHz	DDR266/333 dual channel	3 GB	AGP 8×	MCP2; MCP2-T		
nForce2 IGP	2002	Athlon XP, Athlon, Sempron, Duron		333 MHz, 266 MHz, 200 MHz	DDR266/333 dual channel	3 GB	AGP 8×	MCP2; MCP2-T	GeForce 4 MX IGP	
nForce2 400	2003	Athlon XP, Athlon, Sempron, Duron		400 MHz, 333 MHz, 266 MHz, 200 MHz	DDR266/333/400 single channel	3 GB	AGP 8×	MCP2; MCP2-T; MCP2-S/R/GB		
nForce2 Ultra 400	2003	Athlon XP, Athlon, Sempron, Duron		400 MHz, 333 MHz, 266 MHz, 200 MHz	DDR266/333/400 dual channel	3 GB	AGP 8×	MCP2; MCP2-T; MCP2-S/R/GB		

=== nForce2 Southbridges ===
Model	Release date	Fabrication process (nm)	PCI	USB	FireWire (IEEE1394)	PATA	SATA	LAN	Sound	Features	Notes
MCP2	2002		5 Ports	6 Ports Rev 2.0	No	2 Ports UDMA 133	No	100 Mbit/s	AC'97 2.1		
MCP2-T	2002		5 Ports	6 Ports Rev 2.0	2 Ports	2 Ports UDMA 133	No	2× 100 Mbit/s	AC'97 2.1; NVAPU SoundStorm	additional 100 Mbit/s LAN by 3Com	
MCP2-S/R	2004		6 Ports	8 Ports Rev 2.0	No	2 Ports UDMA 133	2 Ports 1.5 Gbit/s	100 Mbit/s	AC'97 2.1	RAID 0, 1, 0+1 (MCP2-R)	
MCP2-GB	2004		6 Ports	8 Ports Rev 2.0	No	2 Ports UDMA 133	2 Ports 1.5 Gbit/s	1000 Mbit/s	AC'97 2.1	RAID 0, 1, 0+1; Gigabit LAN with nVidia Firewall	

== nForce3 ==
The memory controller is integrated into the CPU, the supported memory types depend on the CPU and socket used.

Model	Code Name	Release date	Processors Supported	Fabrication process (nm)	FSB/HT Frequency (MHz)	AGP	PCI	USB	PATA	SATA	LAN	Sound	Features	Notes
nForce3 150	CK8	September 23, 2003	Athlon 64, Sempron 64; Socket 939, 754	150 nm	HT 600 MHz	AGP 8×	6 Ports	6 Ports Rev 2.0	2 Ports UDMA 133	No	100 Mbit/s	AC'97 2.1		
nForce3 250	CK8	March, 2004	Athlon 64, Sempron 64; Socket 939, 754	150 nm	HT 800 MHz	AGP 8×	6 Ports	8 Ports Rev 2.0	2 Ports UDMA 133	4 Ports 1.5 Gbit/s	100 Mbit/s	AC'97 2.3		GB variant includes gigabit LAN; While the SATA controller supports four drives, the integrated SATA PHY only supports two drives; an external SATA PHY is required to support the other two
nForce3 Ultra	CK8	June 1, 2004	Athlon 64 FX, Athlon 64 X2, Athlon 64, Sempron 64; Socket 939, 754	150 nm	HT 1 GHz	AGP 8×	6 Ports	8 Ports Rev 2.0	2 Ports UDMA 133	4 Ports 1.5 Gbit/s	1000 Mbit/s	AC'97 2.3		While the SATA controller supports four drives, the integrated SATA PHY only supports two drives; an external SATA PHY is required to support the other two

== nForce4 ==
=== For AMD processors ===
The memory controller is integrated into the CPU, the supported memory types depend on the CPU and socket used.

Model	Code Name	Release date	Processors Supported	Fabrication process (nm)	FSB/HT Frequency (MHz)	PCI-Express	SLI	PCI	USB	PATA	SATA	LAN	Sound	Features	Notes
nForce4-4x	CK8-04	October, 2004	Athlon 64 FX, Athlon 64 X2, Athlon 64, Sempron 64; Socket AM2, 939, 754		HT 800 MHz	1.0a 20 lanes	No	6 Ports	10 Ports Rev 2.0	2 Ports UDMA 133	4 Ports 1.5 Gbit/s	1000 Mbit/s	AC'97 2.3		
nForce4	CK8-04	October, 2004	Athlon 64 FX, Athlon 64 X2, Athlon 64, Sempron 64; Socket AM2, 939, 754		HT 1 GHz	1.0a 20 lanes	No	6 Ports	10 Ports Rev 2.0	2 Ports UDMA 133	4 Ports 1.5 Gbit/s	1000 Mbit/s	AC'97 2.3		
nForce4 Ultra	CK8-04	October, 2004	Athlon 64 FX, Athlon 64 X2, Athlon 64, Sempron 64; Socket AM2, 939, 754		HT 1 GHz	1.0a 20 lanes	No	6 Ports	10 Ports Rev 2.0	2 Ports UDMA 133	4 Ports 3.0 Gbit/s	1000 Mbit/s	AC'97 2.3		Same chipset as nForce4 SLI but with some resistors removed thus disabling SLI
nForce4 SLI	CK8-04	October, 2004	Athlon 64 FX, Athlon 64 X2, Athlon 64, Sempron 64; Socket AM2, 939, 754		HT 1 GHz	1.0a 20 lanes	x8+x8	6 Ports	10 Ports Rev 2.0	2 Ports UDMA 133	4 Ports 3.0 Gbit/s	1000 Mbit/s	AC'97 2.3		
nForce4 SLI X16	Crush51 + CK8-04	November, 2005	Athlon 64 FX, Athlon 64 X2, Athlon 64, Sempron 64; Socket 939		HT 1 GHz	1.0a 38 lanes	x16+x16	6 Ports	10 Ports Rev 2.0	2 Ports UDMA 133	4 Ports 3.0 Gbit/s	1000 Mbit/s	AC'97 2.3		

=== For Intel processors (LGA 775) ===
Model	Code Name	Release date	CPU Socket	Processors Supported	Fab (nm)	FSB/HT Frequency (MHz)	Memory	PCI-Express	SLI	PCI	USB	PATA	SATA	LAN	Sound
nForce4 Ultra	Crush19 + MCP51	January 17, 2006	LGA 775	Pentium 4, Pentium EE, Pentium D, Celeron D		1066 MHz	DDR2-667 dual channel	1.0a 20 lanes	No	6 Ports	8 Ports Rev 2.0	2 Ports UDMA 133	4 Ports 3.0 Gbit/s	1000 Mbit/s	HDA
nForce4 SLI XE	Crush19 + MCP51	January 17, 2006	LGA 775	Pentium 4, Pentium EE, Pentium D, Celeron D		1066 MHz	DDR2-667 dual channel	1.0a 20 lanes	×8+×8	6 Ports	8 Ports Rev 2.0	2 Ports UDMA 133	4 Ports 3.0 Gbit/s	1000 Mbit/s	HDA
nForce4 SLI	Crush19 + MCP04	April 5, 2005	LGA 775	Pentium 4, Pentium EE, Pentium D, Celeron D		1066 MHz	DDR2-667 dual channel	1.0a 20 lanes	x8+x8	6 Ports	10 Ports Rev 2.0	2 Ports UDMA 133	4 Ports 3.0 Gbit/s	1000 Mbit/s	AC'97 2.3
nForce4 SLI X16	Crush19 + MCP04	April 5, 2005	LGA 775	Pentium 4, Pentium EE, Pentium D, Celeron D Core 2 (unofficial, some MB)		1066 MHz	DDR2-667 dual channel	1.0a 40 lanes	x16+x16	6 Ports	10 Ports Rev 2.0	2 Ports UDMA 133	4 Ports 3.0 Gbit/s	1000 Mbit/s	AC'97 2.3

== nForce 400 (GeForce 6000) ==
The memory controller is integrated into the CPU, the supported memory types depend on the CPU and socket used. List is incomplete because multiple variants of 410 and 430 exist.

Model	Code Name	Release date	Processors Supported	Fab (nm)	HyperTransport (MHz)	PCI-Express	SLI	PCI	USB	PATA	SATA	LAN	Sound	Features	Notes
GeForce 6100 + nForce 400	MCP61	2006	Athlon 64 X2, Athlon 64, Sempron 64; Socket AM2, 939	90 nm	HT 1 GHz	1.0a 2 lanes	No	6 Ports	8 Ports Rev 2.0	1 Ports UDMA 133	2 Ports 3.0 Gbit/s	100 Mbit/s	HDA	Onboard GeForce 6100	
GeForce 6100 + nForce 405	MCP61	2006	Athlon 64 X2, Athlon 64, Sempron 64; Socket AM2, 939	90 nm	HT 1 GHz	1.0a 10 lanes	No	6 Ports	8 Ports Rev 2.0	1 Ports UDMA 133	2 Ports 3.0 Gbit/s	100 Mbit/s	HDA	Onboard GeForce 6100	
GeForce 6150 + nForce 410	C51G + MCP51	2005	Athlon 64 X2, Athlon 64, Sempron 64; Socket AM2, 939, 754	90 nm	HT 1 GHz (800 MHz s754)	1.0a 18 lanes	No	6 Ports	8 Ports Rev 2.0	2 Ports UDMA 133	2 Ports 3.0 Gbit/s	100 Mbit/s	HDA	Onboard GeForce 6150	
GeForce 6150 + nForce 430 rev. 1	C51G + MCP51	2005	Athlon 64 X2, Athlon 64, Sempron 64; Socket AM2, 939	90 nm	HT 1 GHz	1.0a 18 lanes	No	6 Ports	8 Ports Rev 2.0	2 Ports UDMA 133	4 Ports 3.0 Gbit/s	1000 Mbit/s	HDA	Onboard GeForce 6150	
GeForce 6150 + nForce 430 rev. 2	MCP61	?	Athlon 64 X2, Athlon 64, Sempron 64; Socket AM2, 939	90 nm	HT 1 GHz	1.0a 10 lanes	No	6 Ports	8 Ports Rev 2.0	2 Ports UDMA 133	4 Ports 3.0 Gbit/s	100 Mbit/s	HDA	Onboard GeForce 6150	

== nForce 500 Series ==
=== For AMD processors ===
The memory controller is integrated into the CPU, the supported memory types depend on the CPU and socket used.

Model	Code Name	Release date	CPU Socket	Processors Supported	Fab (nm)	HyperTransport (MHz)	PCI-Express	SLI	PCI	USB	PATA	SATA	LAN	Sound	Features	Notes
nForce 500	CK8-04	2006	Socket AM2	Athlon 64; Athlon 64 X2; Athlon 64 FX; Opteron; Sempron; Phenom; Phenom II		1 GHz	1.0a 20 lanes	No	5 Ports	10 Ports Rev 2.0	2 Ports UDMA 133	4 Ports 1.5 Gbit/s	1000 Mbit/s	AC'97 2.3		Rebranded nForce4
nForce 500 Ultra	CK8-04	2006	Socket AM2	Athlon 64; Athlon 64 X2; Athlon 64 FX; Opteron; Sempron; Phenom; Phenom II		1 GHz	1.0a 20 lanes	No	5 Ports	10 Ports Rev 2.0	2 Ports UDMA 133	4 Ports 3.0 Gbit/s	1000 Mbit/s	AC'97 2.3		Rebranded nForce4 Ultra
nForce 500 SLI	CK8-04	2006	Socket AM2	Athlon 64; Athlon 64 X2; Athlon 64 FX; Opteron; Sempron; Phenom; Phenom II		1 GHz	1.0a 20 lanes	x8+x8	5 Ports	10 Ports Rev 2.0	2 Ports UDMA 133	4 Ports 3.0 Gbit/s	1000 Mbit/s	AC'97 2.3		Rebranded nForce4 SLI
nForce 510	MCP51	2006	Socket AM2	Athlon 64; Athlon 64 X2; Athlon 64 FX; Opteron; Sempron; Phenom; Phenom II		1 GHz	1.0a 20 lanes	No	5 Ports	8 Ports Rev 2.0	1 Ports UDMA 133	2 Ports 3.0 Gbit/s	100 Mbit/s	HDA		
nForce 520 LE	MPC61/MCP65	2007	Socket AM2	Athlon 64; Athlon 64 X2; Athlon 64 FX; Opteron; Sempron; Phenom; Phenom II	90 nm / ?	1 GHz	1.0a 20 lanes	No	5 Ports	8 Ports Rev 2.0	1 Ports UDMA 133	2 Ports 3.0 Gbit/s	100 Mbit/s	HDA		MPC61 is enhanced version of nForce 430 rev.2 with Disabled Onboard GeForce 6100
nForce 520	MCP65	2007	Socket AM2	Athlon 64; Athlon 64 X2; Athlon 64 FX; Opteron; Sempron; Phenom; Phenom II		1 GHz	1.0a 20 lanes	No	5 Ports	10 Ports Rev 2.0	1 Ports UDMA 133	4 Ports 3.0 Gbit/s	100 Mbit/s	HDA		
nForce 550	MCP55	March 7, 2006	Socket AM2	Athlon 64; Athlon 64 X2; Athlon 64 FX; Opteron; Sempron; Phenom; Phenom II		1 GHz	1.0a 20 lanes	No	5 Ports	10 Ports Rev 2.0	1 Ports UDMA 133	4 Ports 3.0 Gbit/s	1000 Mbit/s	HDA		
nForce 560	MCP65	2007	Socket AM2	Athlon 64; Athlon 64 X2; Athlon 64 FX; Opteron; Sempron; Phenom; Phenom II		1 GHz	1.0a 20 lanes	No	5 Ports	10 Ports Rev 2.0	1 Ports UDMA 133	4 Ports 3.0 Gbit/s	1000 Mbit/s	HDA		Same chipset as nForce 570 LT SLI but with some resistors removed thus disabling SLI
nForce 560 SLI	CK8-04	2007	Socket AM2	Athlon 64; Athlon 64 X2; Athlon 64 FX; Opteron; Sempron; Phenom; Phenom II		1 GHz	1.0a 20 lanes	x8+x8	5 Ports	10 Ports Rev 2.0	2 Ports UDMA 133	4 Ports 3.0 Gbit/s	1000 Mbit/s	AC'97 2.3		Rebranded nForce4 SLI
nForce 570 LT SLI	MCP65	2007	Socket AM2	Athlon 64; Athlon 64 X2; Athlon 64 FX; Opteron; Sempron; Phenom; Phenom II		1 GHz	1.0a 20 lanes	x8+x8	5 Ports	10 Ports Rev 2.0	1 Ports UDMA 133	4 Ports 3.0 Gbit/s	1000 Mbit/s	HDA		
nForce 570 Ultra	MCP55	March 7, 2006	Socket AM2	Athlon 64; Athlon 64 X2; Athlon 64 FX; Opteron; Sempron; Phenom; Phenom II		1 GHz	1.0a 20 lanes	No	5 Ports	10 Ports Rev 2.0	1 Ports UDMA 133	6 Ports 3.0 Gbit/s	2× 1000 Mbit/s	HDA		
nForce 570 SLI	MCP55	March 7, 2006	Socket AM2	Athlon 64; Athlon 64 X2; Athlon 64 FX; Opteron; Sempron; Phenom; Phenom II		1 GHz	1.0a 28 lanes	x8+x8	5 Ports	10 Ports Rev 2.0	1 Ports UDMA 133	6 Ports 3.0 Gbit/s	2× 1000 Mbit/s	HDA		
nForce 590 SLI	Crush51 + MCP55	March 7, 2006	Socket AM2	Athlon 64; Athlon 64 X2; Athlon 64 FX; Opteron; Sempron; Phenom; Phenom II		1 GHz	1.0a 46 lanes	x16+x16	5 Ports	10 Ports Rev 2.0	1 Ports UDMA 133	6 Ports 3.0 Gbit/s	2× 1000 Mbit/s	HDA		

=== For Intel processors ===
Model	Code Name	Release date	CPU Socket	Processors Supported	Fab (nm)	FSB/HT Frequency (MHz)	Memory	PCI-Express	SLI	PCI	USB	PATA	SATA	LAN	Sound
nForce 570 SLI	Crush51 + MCP51	2006	LGA 775	Pentium 4, Pentium EE, Pentium D, Celeron D, Core 2		1066 MHz	DDR2-666 dual channel	1.0a 20 lanes	x8+x8 (or x16+x1)	5 Ports	8 Ports Rev 2.0	2 Ports UDMA 133	4 Ports 3.0 Gbit/s	1000 Mbit/s	HDA
nForce 590 SLI	Crush51 + MCP55	2006	LGA 775	Pentium 4, Pentium EE, Pentium D, Celeron D, Core 2		1066 MHz	DDR2-666 dual channel	1.0a 48 lanes	x16+x16	5 Ports	10 Ports Rev 2.0	1 Ports UDMA 133	6 Ports 3.0 Gbit/s	2*1000 Mbit/s	HDA

== nForce 600 (GeForce 7000) Series ==
=== For AMD processors ===
The memory controller is integrated into the CPU, the supported memory types depend on the CPU and socket used.

Model	Code Name	Release date	CPU Socket	Processors Supported	Fab (nm)	HyperTransport (MT/s)	PCI-Express	SLI	PCI	USB	PATA	SATA	LAN	Sound	Graphic
nForce 630a	MCP68	September, 2007	Socket AM2	Athlon 64; Athlon 64 X2; Athlon 64 FX; Opteron; Sempron; Phenom; Phenom II		1.0; 2000	1.1; 20 lanes	No	5 Ports	12 Ports Rev 2.0	1 Ports UDMA 133	4 Ports 3.0 Gbit/s	1000 Mbit/s	HDA	GeForce 7025/7050
nForce 680a SLI	2*MCP55	December 6, 2006	Socket F	AMD Dual Dual-core		2 × 1.0; 2× 2000	1.0a 56 lanes	x16+x16+x8+x8	5 Ports	20 Ports Rev 2.0	2 Ports UDMA 133	12 Ports 3.0 Gbit/s	4 × 1000 Mbit/s	HDA	none

HT1.0 = (2000 MT/s) HT3.0 = (5200 MT/s)

=== For Intel processors ===
Model	Code Name	Release date	CPU Socket	Processors Supported	Fab (nm)	FSB/HT Frequency (MHz)	Memory	PCI-Express	SLI	PCI	USB	PATA	SATA	LAN	Sound	Graphics
nForce 610i	MCP73	2007	LGA 775	Pentium 4, Pentium EE, Pentium D, Celeron D, Core 2		1333 MHz	DDR2-667 single channel	1.1; 18 lanes	No	5 Ports	8 Ports Rev 2.0	2 Ports UDMA 133	4 Ports 3.0 Gbit/s	100 Mbit/s	HDA	GeForce 7050
nForce 630i	MCP73	2007	LGA 775	Pentium 4, Pentium EE, Pentium D, Celeron D, Core 2		1333 MHz	DDR2-800 single channel	1.1; 18 lanes	No	5 Ports	10 Ports Rev 2.0	2 Ports UDMA 133	4 Ports 3.0 Gbit/s	1000 Mbit/s	HDA	GeForce 7100/7150
nForce 650i Ultra	Crush55 + MCP51	2006	LGA 775	Pentium 4, Pentium EE, Pentium D, Celeron D, Core 2		1333 MHz	DDR2-800 dual channel	1.1; 18 lanes	No	5 Ports	8 Ports Rev 2.0	4 Ports UDMA 133	4 Ports 3.0 Gbit/s	1000 Mbit/s	HDA	none
nForce 650i SLI	Crush55 + MCP51	2006	LGA 775	Pentium 4, Pentium EE, Pentium D, Celeron D, Core 2		1333 MHz	DDR2-800 dual channel	1.1; 18 lanes	x8+x8	5 Ports	8 Ports Rev 2.0	4 Ports UDMA 133	4 Ports 3.0 Gbit/s	1000 Mbit/s	HDA	none
nForce 680i LT SLI	Crush55 + MCP55	March 26, 2007	LGA 775	Pentium 4, Pentium EE, Pentium D, Celeron D, Core 2		1333 MHz	DDR2-800 dual channel	1.1; 46 lanes	x16+x16	5 Ports	10 Ports Rev 2.0	2 Ports UDMA 133	6 Ports 3.0 Gbit/s	2*1000 Mbit/s	HDA	none
nForce 680i SLI	Crush55 + MCP55	November 8, 2006	LGA 775	Pentium 4, Pentium EE, Pentium D, Celeron D, Core 2		1333 MHz	DDR2-800 dual channel	1.1; 46 lanes	x16+x16 x8+x8+x8	5 Ports	10 Ports Rev 2.0	2 Ports UDMA 133	6 Ports 3.0 Gbit/s	2*1000 Mbit/s	HDA	none

== nForce 700 Series ==
=== For AMD processors ===
The memory controller is integrated into the CPU; the supported memory is DDR2 in dual channel.

Model	Code Name	Release date	CPU Socket	Processors Supported	Fab (nm)	HT Frequency (MHz)	PCI-Express	SLI	PCI	USB	PATA	SATA	LAN	Sound	Features	Notes
nForce 710a	MCP78	2008	Socket AM2+	Athlon 64; Athlon 64 X2; Athlon 64 FX; Opteron; Sempron; Phenom; Phenom II		HT 3.0; 2.6 GHz	2.0; 20 lanes	No	5 Ports	12 Ports Rev 2.0	1 Ports UDMA 133	6 Ports 3.0 Gbit/s	1000 Mbit/s	HDA		
nForce 720a	MCP78	2008	Socket AM2+	Athlon 64; Athlon 64 X2; Athlon 64 FX; Opteron; Sempron; Phenom; Phenom II		HT 3.0; 2.6 GHz	2.0; 20 lanes	No	5 Ports	12 Ports Rev 2.0	1 Ports UDMA 133	6 Ports 3.0 Gbit/s	1000 Mbit/s	HDA	Onboard GeForce 8100	
nForce 720d	MCP78	2008	Socket AM2+	Athlon 64; Athlon 64 X2; Athlon 64 FX; Opteron; Sempron; Phenom; Phenom II		HT 3.0; 2.6 GHz	2.0; 20 lanes	No	5 Ports	12 Ports Rev 2.0	1 Ports UDMA 133	6 Ports 3.0 Gbit/s	1000 Mbit/s	HDA		Rebranded nForce 710a
nForce 730a	MCP72	May 2008	Socket AM2+	Athlon 64; Athlon 64 X2; Athlon 64 FX; Opteron; Sempron; Phenom; Phenom II		HT 3.0; 2.6 GHz	2.0; 20 lanes	No	5 Ports	12 Ports Rev 2.0	1 Ports UDMA 133	6 Ports 3.0 Gbit/s	1000 Mbit/s	HDA	Onboard GeForce 8200	Hybrid with IGP
nForce 740a SLI	MCP72	May 2008	Socket AM2+	Athlon 64; Athlon 64 X2; Athlon 64 FX; Opteron; Sempron; Phenom; Phenom II		HT 3.0; 2.6 GHz	2.0; 20 lanes	x8+x8	5 Ports	12 Ports Rev 2.0	1 Ports UDMA 133	6 Ports 3.0 Gbit/s	1000 Mbit/s	HDA		
nForce 750a SLI	MCP72	May 2008	Socket AM2+	Athlon 64; Athlon 64 X2; Athlon 64 FX; Opteron; Sempron; Phenom; Phenom II		HT 3.0; 2.6 GHz	2.0; 18 lanes	x8+x8	5 Ports	12 Ports Rev 2.0	1 Ports UDMA 133	6 Ports 3.0 Gbit/s	1000 Mbit/s	HDA	Onboard GeForce 8200	Hybrid with IGP
nForce 780a SLI	MCP72 + nForce200	May 2008	Socket AM2+	Athlon 64; Athlon 64 X2; Athlon 64 FX; Opteron; Sempron; Phenom; Phenom II		HT 3.0; 2.6 GHz	2.0; 51 lanes	x16+x16 x16+x16+x8 x8+x8+x8	5 Ports	12 Ports Rev 2.0	1 Ports UDMA 133	6 Ports 3.0 Gbit/s	1000 Mbit/s	HDA	Onboard GeForce 8200	Hybrid with IGP

=== For Intel processors ===
Model	Code Name	Release date	CPU Socket	Processors Supported	Fab (nm)	FSB/HT Frequency (MHz)	Memory	PCI-Express	SLI	PCI	USB	PATA	SATA	LAN	Sound	Graphics	Notes
nForce 730i	MCP7A	October 16, 2008	LGA 775	Intel Core 2, Pentium Dual-Core, Core-based Celerons		1333 MHz	DDR3-1333 / DDR2-800 dual channel	2.0; 20 lanes	No	5 Ports	12 Ports Rev 2.0	1 Ports UDMA 133	6 Ports 3.0 Gbit/s	1000 Mbit/s	HDA	GeForce 9300	
nForce 740i SLI	MCP7A	October 16, 2008	LGA 775	Intel Core 2, Pentium Dual-Core, Core-based Celerons		1333 MHz	DDR3-1333 / DDR2-800 dual channel	2.0; 20 lanes	x8+x8	5 Ports	12 Ports Rev 2.0	1 Ports UDMA 133	6 Ports 3.0 Gbit/s	1000 Mbit/s	HDA	none	
nForce 750i SLI	Crush72 + MCP51 + nForce200	2007	LGA 775	Intel Core 2, Pentium Dual-Core, Core-based Celerons	90 nm	1333 MHz	DDR2-800 dual channel	2.0; 24 lanes 1.1; 2 lanes	x8+x8	5 Ports	8 Ports Rev 2.0	2 Ports UDMA 133	4 Ports 3.0 Gbit/s	1000 Mbit/s	HDA	none	Unofficial support DDR2-1066
nForce 760i SLI	MCP7A	October 16, 2008	LGA 775	Intel Core 2, Pentium Dual-Core, Core-based Celerons		1333 MHz	DDR3-1333 / DDR2-800 dual channel	2.0; 20 lanes	x8+x8	5 Ports	12 Ports Rev 2.0	1 Port UDMA 133	6 Ports 3.0 Gbit/s	1000 Mbit/s	HDA	GeForce 9300	
nForce 780i SLI	Crush72 + MCP55 + nForce200	December 17, 2007	LGA 775	Intel Core 2, Pentium Dual-Core, Core-based Celerons	90 nm	1333 MHz	DDR2-800 dual channel	2.0; 32 lanes 1.1; 30 lanes	x16+x16+x16	5 Ports	10 Ports Rev 2.0	1 Port UDMA 133	6 Ports 3.0 Gbit/s	2× 1000 Mbit/s	HDA	none	Unofficial support DDR2-1066
nForce 790i SLI	Crush73 + MCP55	March 2008	LGA 775	Intel Core 2, Pentium Dual-Core, Core-based Celerons	90 nm	1600 MHz	DDR3-1333 dual channel, up to 8 GB	2.0; 32 lanes 1.1; 30 lanes	x16+x16+x16	5 Ports	10 Ports Rev 2.0	1 Port UDMA 133	6 Ports 3.0 Gbit/s	2× 1000 Mbit/s	HDA	none	Compatible with Intel 05B/05A/06 processors

== GeForce 8000/9000 Series ==
=== For AMD processors ===
In GeForce 8000/9000-series chipsets the memory controller is integrated into the CPU and the supported memory is DDR2 in dual channel.

Model	Code Name	Release date	CPU Socket	Processors Supported	Fabrication process (nm)	FSB/HT Frequency (MHz)	PCI-Express	SLI	PCI	USB	PATA	SATA	LAN	Sound	Features
GeForce 8100	MCP78	2008	Socket AM2+	Athlon 64; Athlon 64 X2; Athlon 64 FX; Opteron; Sempron; Phenom; Phenom II		HT 3.0; 2.6 GHz	2.0; 19 lanes	No	5 Ports	12 Ports Rev 2.0	1 Ports UDMA 133	6 Ports 3.0 Gbit/s	1000 Mbit/s	HDA	GeForce 8100
GeForce 8200	MCP78	2008	Socket AM2+	Athlon 64; Athlon 64 X2; Athlon 64 FX; Opteron; Sempron; Phenom; Phenom II		HT 3.0; 2.6 GHz	2.0; 19 lanes	No	5 Ports	12 Ports Rev 2.0	1 Ports UDMA 133	6 Ports 3.0 Gbit/s	1000 Mbit/s	HDA	GeForce 8200
GeForce 8300	MCP78	2008	Socket AM2+	Athlon 64; Athlon 64 X2; Athlon 64 FX; Opteron; Sempron; Phenom; Phenom II		HT 3.0; 2.6 GHz	2.0; 19 lanes	No	5 Ports	12 Ports Rev 2.0	1 Ports UDMA 133	6 Ports 3.0 Gbit/s	1000 Mbit/s	HDA	GeForce 8300

=== For Intel processors ===
Model	Code Name	Release date	CPU Socket	Processors Supported	Fab (nm)	FSB/HT Frequency (MHz)	Memory	PCI-Express	SLI	PCI	USB	PATA	SATA	LAN	Sound	Graphics
GeForce 9300	MCP7A	October 2008	LGA 775	Intel Core 2, Pentium Dual-Core, Core-based Celerons		1333 MHz	DDR3-1333 / DDR2-800 dual channel	2.0; 20 lanes	No	5 Ports	12 Ports Rev 2.0	No	6 Ports 3.0 Gbit/s	1000 Mbit/s	HDA	GeForce 9300
GeForce 9400	MCP7A	October 2008	LGA 775	Intel Core 2, Pentium Dual-Core, Core-based Celerons		1333 MHz	DDR3-1333 / DDR2-800 dual channel	2.0; 20 lanes	No	5 Ports	12 Ports Rev 2.0	No	6 Ports 3.0 Gbit/s	1000 Mbit/s	HDA	GeForce 9400

== nForce 900 ==
The memory controller is integrated into the CPU, the supported memory types depend on the CPU and socket used.

Model	Code Name	Release date	CPU Sockets	Processors Supported	Fabrication process (nm)	HyperTransport (MHz)	PCI-Express	SLI	PCI	USB	PATA	SATA	LAN	Sound	Features	Notes
nForce 980a SLI	MCP72 + nForce200	2009	Socket AM3	Phenom, Athlon II, Phenom II, Athlon 64 X2, Athlon 64, Sempron 64		HT 3.0; 2.6 GHz	2.0; 51 lanes	x16+x16 x16+x16+x8 x8+x8+x8	5 Ports	12 Ports Rev 2.0	1 Ports UDMA 133	6 Ports 3.0 Gbit/s	1000 Mbit/s	HDA	GeForce 8200; PureVideo HD, GeForceBoost, HybridPower, SLI-Memory Ready, FirstPacket	Rebranded nForce 780a SLI

== nForce Professional ==
The memory controller is integrated into the CPU, the supported memory types depend on the CPU and socket used.

Model	Code Name	Release date	Processors Supported	Fabrication process (nm)	FSB/HT Frequency (MHz)	AGP	PCI-Express	SLI	PCI	USB	PATA	SATA	LAN	Sound	Features	Notes
nForce3 Professional 150/250	CK8	08/2003	AMD Opteron	150 nm	HT 1.0; 1.6 GHz	AGP 3.0 533 MT/s	No	No	6 Ports	8 Ports Rev 2.0	2 Ports UDMA 133	4 Ports 1.5 Gbit/s	1000 Mbit/s	AC'97 2.1	MediaShield	
nForce Professional 2200 MCP	CK8-04	01/2005	AMD Opteron	150 nm	HT 1 GHz; 2000 MT/s	No	1.0a 20 lanes, 4 links flexible x16: 2 slots	x8+x8	5 Ports	10 Ports Rev 2.0	2 Ports UDMA 133	4 Ports 3.0 Gbit/s	1000 Mbit/s	AC'97 2.3	MediaShield; RAID 0,1,0+1,5	
nForce Professional 2200 and 2050	CK8-04	01/2005	AMD Opteron	150 nm	HT 1 GHz; 2000 MT/s	No	1.0a 40 lanes, 8 links flexible x16: 2 slots	x16+x16	5 Ports	10 Ports Rev 2.0	2 Ports UDMA 133	8 Ports 3.0 Gbit/s	2*1000 Mbit/s	AC'97 2.3	MediaShield; RAID 0,1,0+1,5	
nForce Professional 3400 MCP	MCP55 Pro	2006	AMD Opteron		HT 1 GHz; 2000 MT/s	No	1.0a 28 lanes, 6 links fixed x16: 2 slots	x8+x8	5 Ports	10 Ports Rev 2.0	1 Ports UDMA 133	6 Ports 3.0 Gbit/s	2*1000 Mbit/s	HDA	MediaShield; RAID 0,1,0+1,5	
nForce Professional 3600 MCP	MCP55 Pro	2006	AMD Opteron		HT 1 GHz; 2000 MT/s	No	1.0a 28 lanes, 6 links fixed x16: 2 slots	x8+x8 x16+x8	5 Ports	10 Ports Rev 2.0	1 Ports UDMA 133	6 Ports 3.0 Gbit/s	2*1000 Mbit/s	HDA	MediaShield; RAID 0,1,0+1,5	
nForce Professional 3600 and 3050	MCP55 Pro	2006	AMD Opteron		HT 1 GHz; 2000 MT/s	No	1.0a 56 lanes, 12 links flexible x16: 2 slots	x16+x16	5 Ports	10 Ports Rev 2.0	2 Ports UDMA 133	12 Ports 3.0 Gbit/s	4*1000 Mbit/s	HDA	MediaShield; RAID 0,1,0+1,5	

== Mobile Chipsets ==
=== For AMD processors ===
The memory controller is integrated into the CPU, the supported memory types depend on the CPU and socket used.

Model	Code Name	Release date	Processors Supported	Fabrication process (nm)	FSB/HT Frequency (MHz)	AGP	PCI-Express	SLI	PCI	USB	PATA	SATA	LAN	Sound	Features	Notes
nForce3 Go 120		2003	Turion 64		HT 400 MHz	AGP4X	No	No	6 Ports	6 Ports Rev 2.0	2 Ports UDMA 133	No	100 Mbit/s	AC'97 2.1		
nForce3 Go 150		2003	Turion 64		HT 600 MHz	AGP8X	No	No	6 Ports	6 Ports Rev 2.0	3 Ports UDMA 133	No	1000 Mbit/s	AC'97 2.1		
nForce 430 Go		2005	Turion 64, Sempron 64		HT 800 MHz	No	1.0a 18 lanes	No	6 Ports	8 Ports Rev 2.0	2 Ports UDMA 133	4 Ports 3.0 Gbit/s	1000 Mbit/s	HDA	RAID 0,1,0+1,5	
nForce 610m		2007	Turion 64, Sempron 64		HT 1 GHz	No	1.1; 4 lanes	No	5 Ports	10 Ports Rev 2.0	1 Ports UDMA 133	4 Ports 3.0 Gbit/s	100 Mbit/s	HDA	Onboard GeForce 7000M	
nForce 630m		2007	Turion 64, Sempron 64		HT 1 GHz	No	1.1; 20 lanes	No	5 Ports	10 Ports Rev 2.0	1 Ports UDMA 133	4 Ports 3.0 Gbit/s	1000 Mbit/s	HDA	Onboard GeForce 7150M	
nForce 8200M	MCP77MV	2008	Turion 64, Sempron 64		HT3.0 2.6 GHz	No	2.0; 4 lanes	No	5 Ports	10 Ports Rev 2.0	No	4 Ports 3.0 Gbit/s	1000 Mbit/s	HDA	Onboard GeForce 8200M	

=== For Intel processors ===
Model	Code Name	Release date	Processors Supported	Fabrication process (nm)	FSB/HT Frequency (MHz)	Memory	PCI-Express	SLI	PCI	USB	PATA	SATA	LAN	Sound	Features	Notes
GeForce 9100M	MCP77MH, MCP79MH	2008	Core2 Mobile, Celeron Mobile	65 nm	1066 MHz	DDR3-1066 dual channel	2.0; 20 lanes	No	5 Ports	12 Ports Rev 2.0	No	4 Ports 3.0 Gbit/s	1000 Mbit/s	HDA	Onboard GeForce 9100M	
GeForce 9400M	MCP79MX	2008	Core2 Mobile, Celeron Mobile	65 nm	1066 MHz	DDR3-1066 dual channel	2.0; 20 lanes	x8+x8	5 Ports	12 Ports Rev 2.0	No	6 Ports 3.0 Gbit/s	1000 Mbit/s	HDA	Onboard GeForce 9400M	
GeForce 9400M (ION)	MCP7A-ION/MCP79MX	2009	Atom 2xx/3xx	65 nm	667 MHz	DDR3-1066 dual channel	2.0; 20 lanes	No	5 Ports	12 Ports Rev 2.0	No	6 Ports 3.0 Gbit/s	1000 Mbit/s	HDA	Onboard GeForce 9400M	
GeForce 320M	MCP89	2010	Core2 Mobile (Penryn)	40 nm	1066 MHz	DDR3-1066 dual channel	2.0				No	3.0Gbit/s	1000 Mbit/s	HDA	Onboard GeForce 320M	Used in 13” Apple MacBook Pro and MacBook Air models in 2010. A static amount of 256 MiB of system RAM used as VRAM. Supported DirectX 10.1 instead of 10.0, unlike earlier chipsets. Similarly, audio w/ video is supported over its mini-DP port, whereas prior chipsets only supported video out. Up to 16 GB of RAM can be used, official Apple documentation is incorrect.

== See also ==
- Comparison of Nvidia graphics processing units
- Comparison of AMD chipsets
- Comparison of ATI chipsets
- List of Intel chipsets
- List of VIA chipsets
- Larrabee
