= NForce2 =

Chipset

Nvidia nForce2
- CPU supported: Athlon
- Socket supported: Socket A

Miscellaneous
- Release date: July 2002
- Predecessor: nForce
- Successor: nForce3

The Nvidia nForce2 chipset was released by Nvidia in July 2002 as a refresh to the original nForce product offering. The nForce2 chipset was a platform for motherboards supporting AMD's Socket A CPUs along with DDR SDRAM. There were multiple variations of the chipset including one with an integrated GeForce4 MX graphics processor (IGP), and one without.

== Refresh ==
In 2003, Nvidia released refreshed nForce2 chips, called "nForce2 400" and "nForce2 Ultra 400". The nForce2 400 and nForce2 Ultra 400 presented official support for a 200 MHz FSB and PC-3200 DDR SDRAM, whereas the older nForce2 only supported a maximum of 166 MHz FSB. Ultra 400 offered dual-channel support, while the plain 400 was single-channel PC-3200-capable. Both performed very similarly because neither had the IGP. Athlon XP did not benefit significantly from the added bandwidth because the Athlon XP's bus was only capable of bandwidth matching a single channel of PC-3200.

The new chipset was partnered with several different southbridges, including one with (MCP-T) and one without (MCP) SoundStorm and dual Ethernet NICs. In 2004, three new southbridges were introduced: MCP-S integrated Serial ATA, MCP-RAID had additional RAID-functions, and MCP-Gb featured Gigabit Ethernet. These newer southbridges did not integrate the SoundStorm unit nor the dual-Ethernet capabilities of the MCP-T.

== See also ==
- Comparison of Nvidia chipsets
