= Touched with Fire =

Touched with Fire may refer to:

- Touched with Fire (book), a book by the American psychologist Kay Redfield Jamison
- Touched with Fire (film), a 2015 American drama film
