= Creativity and mental health =

Concept in psychology

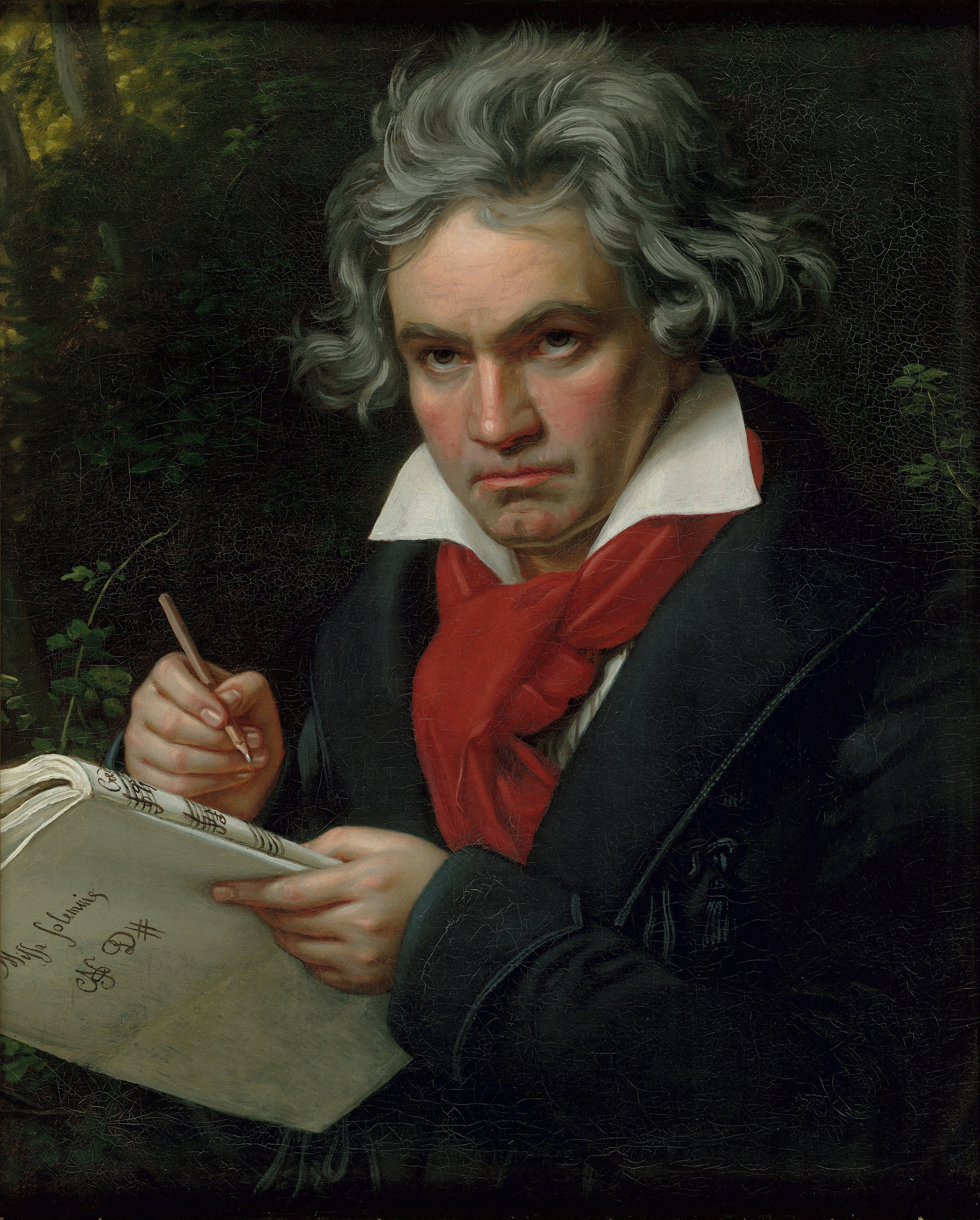
Composer Ludwig van Beethoven may have had bipolar disorder.

Links between creativity and mental health have been extensively discussed and studied by psychologists and other researchers for centuries. Parallels can be drawn to connect creativity to major mental disorders including bipolar disorder, autism, schizophrenia, major depressive disorder, anxiety disorder, and ADHD. For example, studies have demonstrated correlations between creative occupations and people living with mental illness. There are cases that support the idea that mental illness can aid in creativity, but it is also generally agreed that mental illness does not have to be present for creativity to exist.

== History ==
It has been proposed that there is a link between creativity and mental illness. Major depressive disorder appears among playwrights, novelists, biographers, and artists at a higher rate than the general population. Association between mental illness and creativity first appeared in academic literature in the 1970s, but speculation about a link between "madness" and "genius" dates back at least to the time of Aristotle, to whom Seneca attributes the aphorism "No great mind has ever existed without a touch of madness." Even before Aristotle, Plato spoke of artistic inspiration as occurring during a state of frantic senselessness. The word "genius" may refer to literary genius, creative genius, scholarly genius, "all around" genius, etc. The Ancient Greeks believed that creativity came from the gods, in particular the Muses (the mythical personifications of the arts and sciences, the nine daughters of Zeus). In the Aristotelian tradition, genius was viewed from a physiological standpoint, and it was believed that the same human quality was perhaps responsible for both extraordinary achievement and melancholy. On this topic, Romantic writers had similar ideals, with Lord Byron having pleasantly expressed, "We of the craft are all crazy. Some are affected by gaiety, others by melancholy, but all are more or less touched".

Individuals with mental illness are said to display a capacity to see the world in a novel and original way; literally, to see things that others cannot. However, people do not require a mental illness to do so.

== Studies ==
For many years, the creative arts, from visual arts and writing to music and drama, have been used in therapy for those recovering from mental illness or addiction.

Another study found that increased levels of creativity were more common amongst those with schizotypal personality disorder than in people with either schizophrenia or people without mental health diagnoses. While divergent thinking was associated with bilateral activation of the prefrontal cortex, schizotypal individuals were found to have much greater activation of their right prefrontal cortex. This study hypothesized that such individuals are better at accessing both hemispheres, allowing them to make novel associations at a faster rate. Consistent with this hypothesis, ambidexterity is also more common in people with schizotypal personality disorder as well as people with schizophrenia.

Three studies by Mark Batey and Adrian Furnham have demonstrated the relationships between schizotypal and hypomanic personality and several different measures of creativity. Specifically, Divergent Thinking Fluency, the Biographical Inventory of Creative Behaviors, as well as Self-rated Creativity.

Particularly strong links have been identified between creativity and mood disorders, particularly manic-depressive disorder (a.k.a. bipolar disorder) and depressive disorder (a.k.a. unipolar disorder). In Touched with Fire: Manic-Depressive Illness and the Artistic Temperament, Kay Redfield Jamison summarizes studies of mood-disorder rates in writers, poets and artists. She also explores research that identifies mood disorders in such famous writers and artists as Ernest Hemingway (who shot himself after electroconvulsive treatment), Virginia Woolf (who drowned herself when she felt a depressive episode coming on), composer Robert Schumann (who died in a mental institution), and famed visual artist Michelangelo.

A study by Simon Kyaga and others looked at 300,000 people with schizophrenia, bipolar disorder or unipolar depression, and their relatives, and found overrepresentation in creative professions for those with bipolar disorder as well as for undiagnosed siblings of those with schizophrenia or bipolar disorder. There was no overall overrepresentation, but overrepresentation for artistic occupations, among those diagnosed with schizophrenia. There was no association for those with unipolar depression or their relatives.

A study involving more than one million people, conducted by Swedish researchers at the Karolinska Institute, reported a number of correlations between creative occupations and mental illnesses. Writers had a higher risk of anxiety and bipolar disorders, schizophrenia, unipolar depression, and substance abuse, and were almost twice as likely as the general population to commit suicide. Dancers and photographers were also more likely to have bipolar disorder.

However, as a broader group, those in the creative professions (defined as "scientific and artistic occupations") were no more likely to experience psychiatric disorders than other people, although they were more likely to have a close relative with a disorder, including anorexia and, to some extent, autism, the Journal of Psychiatric Research reports.

Psychological stress has also been found to impede spontaneous creativity. In fact, Robert Epstein describes it as a creativity killer. Instead, people must work to cultivate creativity like any other skill. He found that capturing ideas, seeking out challenges, acquiring knowledge, and surrounding oneself with others in the profession help creativity grow rather than focusing on stress.

A 2005 study at the Stanford University School of Medicine measured creativity by showing children figures of varying complexity and symmetry and asking whether they like or dislike them. The study showed for the first time that a sample of children who either have or are at high risk for bipolar disorder tend to dislike simple or symmetric symbols more. Children with bipolar parents who were not bipolar themselves also scored higher dislike scores.

A study by Sally Anne Gross and George Musgrave suggested that high levels of self-reported anxiety and depression amongst musicians might be explained, at least in part, by the nature of their working conditions.

In the book entitled, How to Go Mad Without Losing Your Mind: Madness and Black Radical Creativity, the author, La Marr Jurelle Bruce creates distinctions between states of madness as phenomenal, medicalized, psychosocial, and enveloped within the emotion of rage. Through interdisciplinary study, the book fosters definitions for metaphorical conceptions that characterize the plight of American artists and the wider appetite for emergent and/or spontaneous creative tendencies.

== Mood and creativity ==
There have been many studies on the correlation between mood and creativity with very different results. Some studies seem to show a correlation between positive mood (affect) and heightened creativity. Other studies show that negative moods seem to be correlated with heightened creativity. One such research paper concludes, "Negative moods signal that the status quo is problematic and that additional effort needs to be exerted to come up with new and useful ideas." The debate is not binary, with some studies saying that both positive and negative emotions play a role in creativity. Additionally, the connection between mood and creativity is rarely direct; rather, being in certain moods forces or fosters people into certain actions that make them more creative at the moment. For instance, negative emotions have been shown to increase the amount a person will reflect and ruminate, which then can cause a person to be more creative.

== Bipolar disorder ==
Bipolar disorder may stimulate creativity, as manic episodes can include prolonged periods of elevated energy. The first empirical study about this topic was done by Nancy Andreasen in the 1970s. She expected for the correlation to be between creativity and schizophrenia. She instead discovered that the correlation was actually between creativity and those with mood disorders. Specifically, that 80% of her sample had experienced at least one major episode. In her follow-up study 15 years later, she found that 43% had been diagnosed with bipolar disorder and 2 had committed suicide. In her book Touched with Fire, American clinical psychologist Kay Redfield Jamison wrote that 38% of writers and poets had been treated for a type of mood disorder, and 89% of creative writers and artists had experienced "intense, highly productive, and creative episodes". These were characterized by "pronounced increases in enthusiasm, energy, self-confidence, speed of mental association, fluency of thought and elevated mood". Although mania is characterized by reckless and possibly self-destructive behavior, in milder forms, the energy and free-flowing thinking of mania can fuel creativity.

There is a range of types of bipolar disorder. Individuals with bipolar I disorder experience severe episodes of mania and depression with periods of wellness between episodes. The severity of the manic episodes can mean that the person is seriously disabled and unable to express the heightened perceptions and flight of thoughts and ideas in a practical way. Individuals with bipolar II disorder experience milder periods of hypomania during which the flight of ideas, faster thought processes and ability to take in more information can be converted to art, poetry or design. In a study done by Shapiro and Weisberg, they found that it was not the depressive episodes, but rather coming out of them that sparked the creativity. Specifically, the self-image that one has during hypomania causing them to be more self-confident and allows them to have the confidence to create.

Dutch artist Vincent Van Gogh is widely theorized to have had bipolar disorder. Other notable creative people with bipolar disorder include Carrie Fisher, Demi Lovato, Kanye West, Stephen Fry (who has cyclothymia, a milder and more chronic form of bipolar disorder), Mariah Carey, Jaco Pastorius, Catherine Zeta-Jones, Jean-Claude Van Damme, Ronald Braunstein, and Patty Duke.

== Schizophrenia ==
People with schizophrenia live with positive, negative, and cognitive symptoms. Positive symptoms (psychotic behaviors that are not present in healthy people) include hallucinations, delusions, thought and movement disorders. Negative symptoms (abnormal functioning of emotions and behavior) include flat affect, anhedonia, among others. Cognitive symptoms include problems with executive functioning, attention, and memory. One artist known for his schizophrenia was the Frenchman Antonin Artaud, founder of the Theatre of Cruelty movement. In Madness and Modernism (1992), clinical psychologist Louis A. Sass noted that many common traits of schizophrenia – especially fragmentation, defiance of authority, and multiple viewpoints – happen to also be defining features of modern art. However, it has been found that those who have it are the most creative either before or after active periods, not during them.

Multiple research studies study a link between reduced latent inhibition, and the psychopathology of acute-phase schizophrenia. This is suggestive of a correlation between psychopathology and creativity, but should not be interpreted as a causal relationship.

== Arguments that support link ==
In a 2002 conversation with Christopher Langan, educational psychologist Arthur Jensen stated that the relationship between creativity and mental disorder "has been well researched and is proven to be a fact", writing that schizothyme characteristics are somewhat more frequent in philosophers, mathematicians, and scientists than in the general population. In a 2015 study, Icelandic scientists found that people in creative professions are 25% more likely to have gene variants that increase the risk of bipolar disorder and schizophrenia, with decode Genetics co-founder Kári Stefánsson saying, "Often, when people are creating something new, they end up straddling between sanity and insanity. I think these results support the concept of the mad genius."

=== Bipolar disorder ===
Many famous historical figures gifted with creative talents may have been affected by bipolar disorder. Ludwig van Beethoven, Kanye West, Virginia Woolf, Ernest Hemingway, Isaac Newton, Judy Garland, Jaco Pastorius and Robert Schumann are some people whose lives have been researched to discover signs of mood disorder. In many instances, creativity and mania – the overwhelming highs that bipolar individuals often experience – share some common traits, such as a tendency for "thinking outside the box," flights of ideas, the speeding up of thoughts and heightened perception of visual, auditory and somatic stimuli.

Research indicates that the brains of creative individuals are more receptive to environmental stimuli due to lower levels of latent inhibition—the unconscious capacity to ignore irrelevant stimuli. While reduced latent inhibition has been linked to a predisposition toward psychosis, it may also facilitate original thinking, especially when combined with high intelligence. A study published in the Journal of Personality and Social Psychology found that individuals with high creative achievements had significantly lower latent inhibition scores compared to those with lower creative achievements.

=== Emotions ===
Research indicates that individuals with high creative achievement often exhibit decreased latent inhibition (LI), which is the unconscious capacity to ignore irrelevant stimuli. While reduced LI is associated with a heightened risk for psychosis, it may also facilitate original thinking by allowing a greater influx of environmental stimuli into conscious awareness. This effect is particularly pronounced in individuals with high intellectual functioning. Because mania and hypomania may decrease social inhibition, performers who have bipolar disorder may become more daring and bolder during an episode. Other creators may exhibit characteristics often associated with mental illness that are not necessarily equivalent to a full-blown manic episode.

=== Posthumous diagnosis ===
Some creative people have been posthumously diagnosed as experiencing bipolar or unipolar disorder based on biographies, letters, correspondence, contemporaneous accounts, or other anecdotal material, most notably in Kay Redfield Jamison's book Touched with Fire: Manic-Depressive Illness and the Artistic Temperament. Touched with Fire presents the argument that bipolar disorder, and affective disorders more generally, may be found in a disproportionate number of people in creative professions such as actors, artists, comedians, musicians, authors, performers and poets.

Scholars have also speculated that the visual artist Michelangelo lived with depression. In the book Famous Depressives: Ten Historical Sketches, MJ Van Lieburg argues that elements of depression are prominent in some of Michelangelo's sculptures and poetry. Van Lieburg also draws additional support from Michelangelo's letters to his father in which he states:

I lead a miserable existence and reck not of life nor honour – that is of this world; I live wearied by stupendous labours and beset by a thousand anxieties. And thus I lived for some fifteen years now and never an hour's happiness have I had.

=== Positive correlation ===
Several recent clinical studies have also suggested that there is a positive correlation between creativity and bipolar disorder, although the relationship between the two is unclear. Temperament may be an intervening variable. Ambition has also been identified as being linked to creative output in people across the bipolar spectrum. Can Music Make You Sick? Measuring the Price of Musical Ambition by Sally Anne Gross and George Musgrave suggests that high levels of self-reported anxiety and depression amongst musicians can be explained, at least in part, by the nature of musicians' working conditions.

=== Mental illness and divergent thinking ===
In 2017, associate professor of psychiatry Gail Saltz stated that the increased production of divergent thoughts in people with mild to moderate mental illnesses leads to greater creative capacities. Saltz argued that the "wavering attention and day-dreamy state" of ADHD, for example, "is also a source of highly original thinking ... CEOs of companies such as Ikea and Jetblue have ADHD. Their creativity, out-of-the-box thinking, high energy levels, and disinhibited manner could all be a positive result of their [condition]." Mania risk has also been credited with aiding in creative accomplishments because "when speed of thinking increases, word associations form more freely, as do flight of ideas, because the manic mind is less inclined to filtering details that, in a normal state, would be dismissed as irrelevant."

=== Brain imaging and genetic links ===
Brain imaging studies have consistently reported that low-latent inhibition is associated with originality, creative personalities, and high levels of creative achievement. There have also been genetic studies conducted to consider genetic links between creativity and psychopathology. Several genes that have been flagged as linking to some forms of psychopathology have also been linked to creativity. These include polymorphisms of the DRD2 and DRD4 genes, the 5HT2a gene, and the NRG1 gene.

=== Correlation but not causation ===
Several studies suggest a consistent link between creativity and those with either mild forms of bipolar disorder or family histories of bipolar disorder, but not full-blown Bipolar I Disorder. These findings reiterate that creative individuals are more likely on the mild end of psychosis spectrums, but not repeatedly beyond that point. One study wrote that "only elevated levels of schizotypy and psychosis-proneness found in divergent thinkers or possessing some indicators of schizotypy promotes creative achievement but not full-blown schizophrenia". Another article writes that "it is likely that psychopathology and creativity are closely related; sharing many traits and antecedents but outright psychopathology may be negatively associated with creativity".

These correlations could be due, in part, to shared vulnerability factors between creativity and psychopathology, including neural hyper-connectivity, novelty salience, cognitive disinhibition, and emotional lability. There are also shared environmental factors that can simultaneously increase potential for creativity and vulnerability to psychopathology. These factors continue to drive further research, like the study Anxiety and Adverse Life Events in Professional Creative and Early Psychosis Populations (Crabtree et al.).

== Creativity and mental well-being ==
There is a popular Indian cultural belief that deep pain can enhance creativity, and that creative acts may help in healing emotional wounds. This idea is rooted in traditional healing practices, where suffering is viewed as a potential pathway to personal insight and transformation.

The healing power of creativity is frequently observed in both clinical and everyday settings. Engaging in artistic outlets—such as writing, music, or visual art—has been shown to facilitate emotional processing, reduce symptoms of anxiety and depression, and improve overall well-being. For many people, creativity serves as a way to cope with trauma, depression, and emotional crises, offering a constructive outlet for intense emotions.

Moreover, creativity can significantly impact mental health and well-being by helping individuals find meaning, purpose, and a strengthened sense of identity. Participation in creative activities is associated with improved self-worth, emotional regulation, and resilience.

== Notable individuals ==
This is a list of individuals whose creative sensibilities have been linked to their mental health.

- John Nash (1928–2015) was an American economist, noted for his contributions to game theory, who was diagnosed with paranoid schizophrenia. After undergoing several different treatments and therapies over the course of several decades, Nash effectively eschewed further psychiatric intervention and gradually adjusted to dealing with his symptoms without the usage of medications; he eventually returned to his field and earned a Nobel Prize in Economics in 1994.
- Joanne Greenberg (born 1932) is an American author who wrote I Never Promised You a Rose Garden (1964), an autobiographical account of her teenage years in Chestnut Lodge working with Frieda Fromm-Reichmann. At the time she was diagnosed with schizophrenia, although two psychiatrists who examined Greenberg's self-description in the book in 1981 concluded that she did not have schizophrenia, but had extreme depression and somatization disorder. The narrative constantly puts difference between the protagonist's mental illness and her artistic ability. Greenberg is adamant that her creative skills flourished in spite of, not because of, her condition:

I wrote [I Never Promised You a Rose Garden] as a way of describing mental illness without the romanticisation [sic] that it underwent in the sixties and seventies when people were taking LSD to simulate what they thought was a liberating experience. During those days, people often confused creativity with insanity. There is no creativity in madness; madness is the opposite of creativity, although people may be creative in spite of being mentally ill.

This statement from Greenberg originally appeared on the Amazon.com product page for Rose Garden and has been cited in several published works including Asylum: Callaway, E. (2007). Asylum: A mid-century madhouse and its lessons about our mentally ill today. Praeger.

- Brian Wilson (1942–2025), founding member of American rock band the Beach Boys, had bipolar and schizoaffective disorder. In 2002, after undergoing treatment, he spoke of how medication affects his creativity, explaining: "I haven't been able to write anything for three years. I think I need the demons in order to write, but the demons have gone. It bothers me a lot. I've tried and tried, but I just can't seem to find a melody."
- Daniel Johnston (1961–2019) was an American singer-songwriter whose music was often attributed to his psychological issues. In a press release issued by his manager, it was requested that reporters refrain from describing Johnston as a "genius" due to the musician's emotional instabilities. The Guardian's David McNamee argued that "it's almost taboo to say anything critical about Johnston. This is incredibly patronizing. For one thing, it makes any honest evaluation of his work impossible."
- Marij Kogoj (1892–1956) was a Slovenian composer with schizophrenia.
- Terry A. Davis (1969–2018) was an American computer programmer who singlehandedly created and designed an entire operating system, TempleOS, alongside full 2D and 3D graphics libraries, a programming language (HolyC) and a compiler. Although his remarks were often incomprehensible or abrasive, he was known to be exceptionally lucid if the topic of discussion was computers. He refused medication for his schizophrenia because he believed it limited his creativity. In 2017, the OS was shown as a part of an outsider art exhibition in Bourgogne, France.
- Kanye West (born 1977) is an American record producer, rapper, singer, and fashion designer who has been diagnosed with bipolar disorder. West has said on his disorder, "I can just tell you what I'm feeling at the time, and I feel a heightened connection with the universe when I'm ramping up. It is a health issue. This – it's like a sprained brain, like having a sprained ankle. And if someone has a sprained ankle, you're not going to push on him more. With us, once our brain gets to a point of spraining, people do everything to make it worse."

== See also ==
- Mad scientist
- Savant syndrome
- Tortured artist
- Outsider art § Art of the mentally ill
- Rainer M. Holm-Hadulla § Dialectical theory of creativity
- Sylvia Plath effect
