= Terry A. Davis =

American computer programmer (1969–2018)

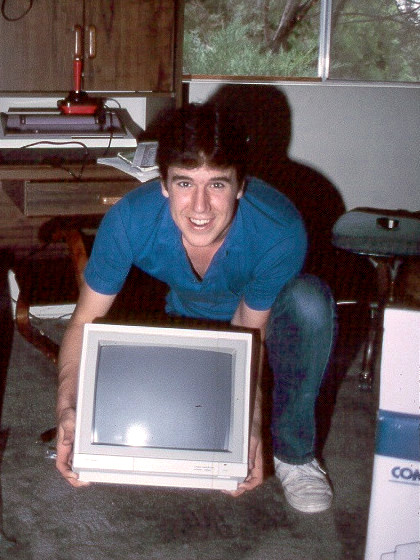
- Davis holding a Commodore computer monitor c. 1985
- Born: Terrence Andrew Davis; December 15, 1969; West Allis, Wisconsin, U.S.
- Died: August 11, 2018 (aged 48); The Dalles, Oregon, U.S.
- Cause of death: Struck by a train
- Other names: The Smartest Programmer That Has Ever Lived, King Terry the Terrible
- Education: Arizona State University (BS, MS)
- Occupations: Computer programmer; YouTuber
- Employer: Ticketmaster (1990–1996)
- Known for: TempleOS
- Website: templeos.org

Terrence Andrew Davis (December 15, 1969 – August 11, 2018) was an American electrical engineer, computer programmer, and outsider artist best known for creating and designing TempleOS, a public-domain operating system, written in a programming language developed by himself called HolyC. He believed God had commanded him to create TempleOS as the Third Temple prophesied in the Bible. In 1996, Davis began experiencing regular manic episodes, some of which led to hospitalization. Initially diagnosed with bipolar disorder, he was later declared to have schizophrenia. Eight months before his death, he struggled with periods of homelessness. His fans brought him supplies, but Davis refused their offers of housing. He recorded a video in which he said that he deleted most of his content to not make the Internet dirty and that he was extremely ill. In August 2018, he was struck by a train and died at the age of 48.

== Early life and career ==
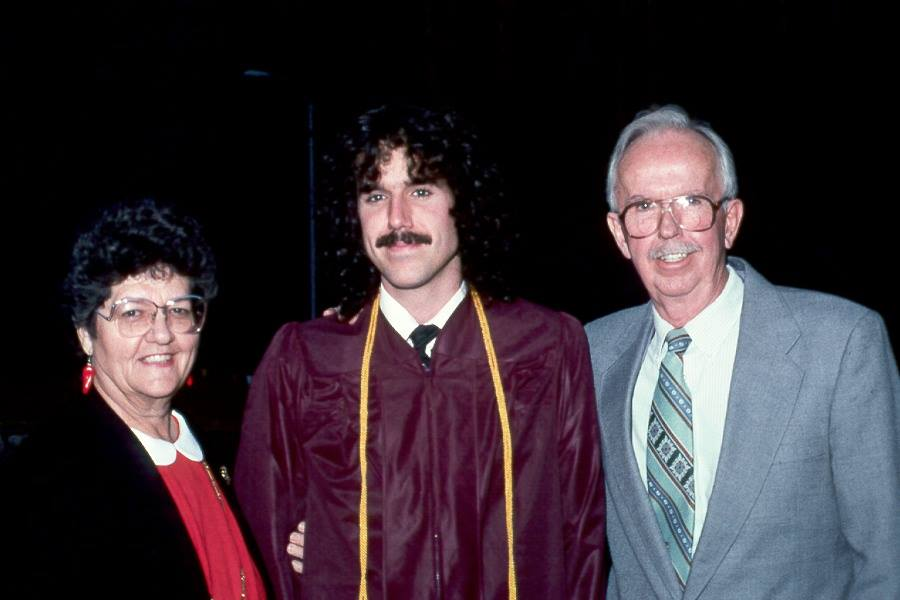
Davis with his parents, 1990

Terrence Andrew Davis was born in West Allis, Wisconsin, on December 15, 1969, as the seventh of eight children; his father was an industrial engineer. The family moved to Washington, Michigan, California and Arizona. As a child, Davis used an Apple II at his elementary school, later learning assembly language on a Commodore 64 as a teenager. Davis grew up Catholic.

In 1994, he earned his master's degree in electrical engineering from Arizona State University. On the subject of his certifications, he wrote in 2011: "Everybody knows electrical is higher in the engineering pecking order than [computer systems] because it requires real math". For several years he worked at Ticketmaster on VAX machines.

== Onset of mental illness ==
Davis became an atheist and described himself as a scientific materialist until experiencing what he called a "revelation from God". Starting in March 1996, Davis was admitted to a psychiatric ward around every six months for recurring manic episodes. He also developed beliefs centering around space aliens and government agents. According to Davis, he attributed a profound quality to the Rage Against the Machine lyric "some of those that work forces are the same that burn crosses" and recalled "I started seeing people following me around in suits and stuff. It just seemed something was strange." He donated large sums of money to charity organizations, something he had never done before. Later, he surmised, "that act [probably] caused God to reveal Himself to me and saved me."

Due to fear of the figures he believed were following him, Davis drove hundreds of miles south with no destination. After becoming convinced that his car radio was communicating with him, he dismantled his vehicle to search for tracking devices he believed were hidden in it, and threw his keys into the desert. He walked along the side of the highway, where he was then picked up by a police officer, who escorted Davis to the passenger seat of his cruiser.

Davis escaped from the patrol vehicle and was hospitalized due to a broken collarbone. Distressed about a conversation in the hospital over artifacts found in his X-ray scans, interpreted by him as "alien artifacts", he ran from the hospital. He attempted to carjack a nearby truck before being arrested. In jail, he stripped himself, broke his glasses, and jammed the frames into a nearby electrical outlet, trying to open his cell door by switching the breaker. This failed, as he had been wearing non-conductive frames. He was admitted to a mental hospital for two weeks.

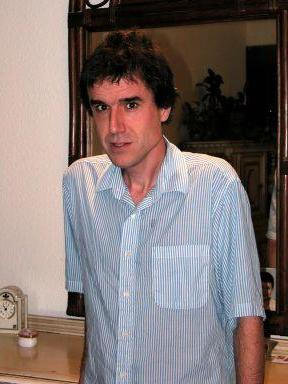
Davis in 2000

Davis was initially diagnosed with bipolar disorder and later declared to have schizophrenia. He felt "guilty for being such a technology-advocate atheist" and tried to follow Jesus by giving away all of his possessions and living a nomadic lifestyle. In July 1996, he returned to Arizona and started formulating plans for a new business. He designed a three-axis milling machine, as he recalled having 3D printing in mind as an obvious pursuit, but a Dremel tool incident nearly set his apartment on fire, prompting him to abandon the idea. He subsequently lived with his parents in Las Vegas and collected Social Security disability payments. He attempted to write a sequel to George Orwell's Nineteen Eighty-Four (1949), but he never finished it. Davis later wrote that he found work at a company named "Xytec Corp" between 1997 and 1999, making FPGA-based image processing equipment. He said the next two years were spent at H.A.R.E., where he wrote an application called SimStructure, and the two years after that were spent at Graphic Technologies, where he was "head software/electrical engineer". After 2003, Davis's hospitalizations became less frequent. His schizophrenia still affected his communication skills, and his online comments were usually incomprehensible, but he was reported as "always lucid" if the topic was about computers. Vice noted that, in 2012, he had a productive conversation with the contributors at MetaFilter, where his work was introduced as "an operating system written by a schizophrenic programmer".

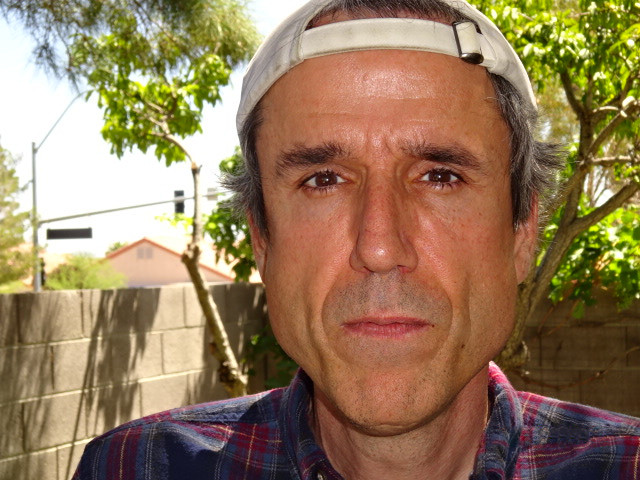
Davis's self-portrait, c. 2017

Between 2003 and 2014, Davis had not been hospitalized for any mental illness-related incidents. In an interview, he said that he had been "genuinely pretty crazy in a way. Now I'm not. I'm crazy in a different way maybe." Davis acknowledged that the sequence of events leading to his spiritual awakening might give the impression of mental illness, as opposed to a divine revelation. He said, "I'm not especially proud of the logic and thinking. It looks very young and childish and pathetic. [...] In the Bible it says if you seek God, He will be found [sic] of you. I was really seeking, and I was looking everywhere to see what he might be saying to me."

== TempleOS ==
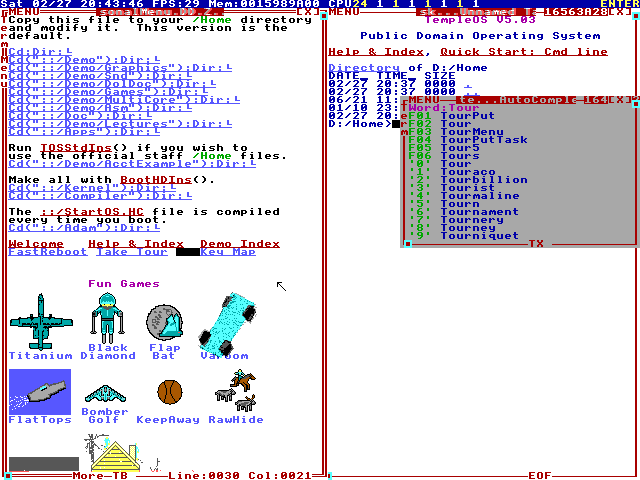
A screenshot of the TempleOS interface

TempleOS is a biblical-themed operating system designed to be the Third Temple prophesied in the Bible. Known as J Operating System from 2004 to 2005, LoseThos from 2006 to 2012, and SparrowOS in late 2012, TempleOS is similar to the Commodore 64, DESQview and other early DOS-based interfaces, and was written in a programming language developed by Davis called HolyC, which is a middle ground between C and C++. Described as being more flexible than C, HolyC was conceived of by Davis in the early 2000s and developed alone over the course of a decade. TempleOS included the design of its original programming language, editor, compiler and kernel, and it ultimately had over 120,000 lines of code.

In 2005, Davis stated that his ambition for the J Operating System was to recapture the rapidly changing environment of the Commodore 64 era, as well as encouraging the creation of "odd-ball software." He envisioned the system as a Commodore 64 with greater processing speed. In 2008, he wrote that TempleOS was primarily intended to create video games, and that it has no Internet functionality, claiming that doing so would be the same as reinventing the wheel.

Davis proclaimed later in TempleOS's development that he was in direct communication with God, who told him to build a successor to the Second Temple as an operating system. As such, references to Biblical tropes are ubiquitous in the OS. One bundled program, "AfterEgypt", is a game in which the player travels to a burning bush to use a "high-speed stopwatch". The stopwatch is meant to act as an oracle that generates pseudo-random text, something Davis believed to be coded messages from God. He likened the process to a Ouija board and speaking in tongues. As an example:

among consigned penally result perverseness checked stated held sensation reasonings skies adversity Dakota lip Suffer approached enact displacing feast Canst pearl doing alms comprehendeth nought

— "AfterEgypt"

According to Davis, many of the system's features, such as its 640×480 resolution and 16-color display, were also explicit instructions from God. The charter on his website stated that TempleOS was God's official temple and a place where offerings are made and God's oracle could be consulted, like Solomon's Temple. He used the oracle to ask God about war ("servicemen competing"), death ("awful"), dinosaurs ("Brontosaurs' feet hurt when stepped"), favorite video game (Donkey Kong ), favorite car (BMW), favorite national anthem (Latvia's), favorite band (the Beatles), and the 11th commandment ("Thou shall not litter"). The idea of using a complex system to communicate with the supernatural world is not new and can well be called a unique practice of divination in general, which is characterized by deriving meaning from the random.

Regarding the philosophy of the built‑in games in the system—their simplicity—Davis said: "If you have something high-quality, it intimidates the locals, and so—like in TempleOS—I don't want high-quality games because it intimidates people." He explained that he wanted people to look at his creation and see it as something that ordinary "mortals" could reproduce themselves, encouraging them to try creating something similar.

Davis stated that the operating system was downloaded 10,000 times between 2009 and 2012. Later that year, he renamed the operating system to "SparrowOS", then to "TempleOS" the following year. A few weeks later, his website announced: "God's temple is finished. Now, God kills CIA until it spreads".

== Recognition, criticism, and following ==
What people are going to read is, "It's about a pathetic schizophrenic who made a crappy operating system." My perspective is, "God said I made His temple."

— Davis in regard to an article about his life, from an email to a Vice journalist.

Once TempleOS was completed, most of Davis's time was spent browsing the Internet, coding, or using the results of the National Institute of Standards and Technology's randomness beacon to further his relationship with God, and he drew fans following his various online activities. He posted video blogs and would refer to himself as "the smartest programmer that's ever lived" while showing his creations. His YouTube channels were repeatedly terminated due to his vulgarities. In 2017, the OS was shown as a part of an outsider art exhibition in Bourogne, France. Davis said he was happy to receive the attention but was disappointed that few of his fans had used the OS to speak to God.

Davis would frequently communicate in randomly generated blocks of text and off-topic declarations about God, which led to bans from websites including Something Awful, Instagram, Reddit, and Hacker News. However, the critical reception to TempleOS was mostly favorable, as tech journalist David Cassel wrote, "programming websites tried to find the necessary patience and understanding to accommodate Davis". TechRepublic and OSNews published positive articles on Davis's work, even though he had been banned from OSNews for hostile comments targeting its readers and staff.

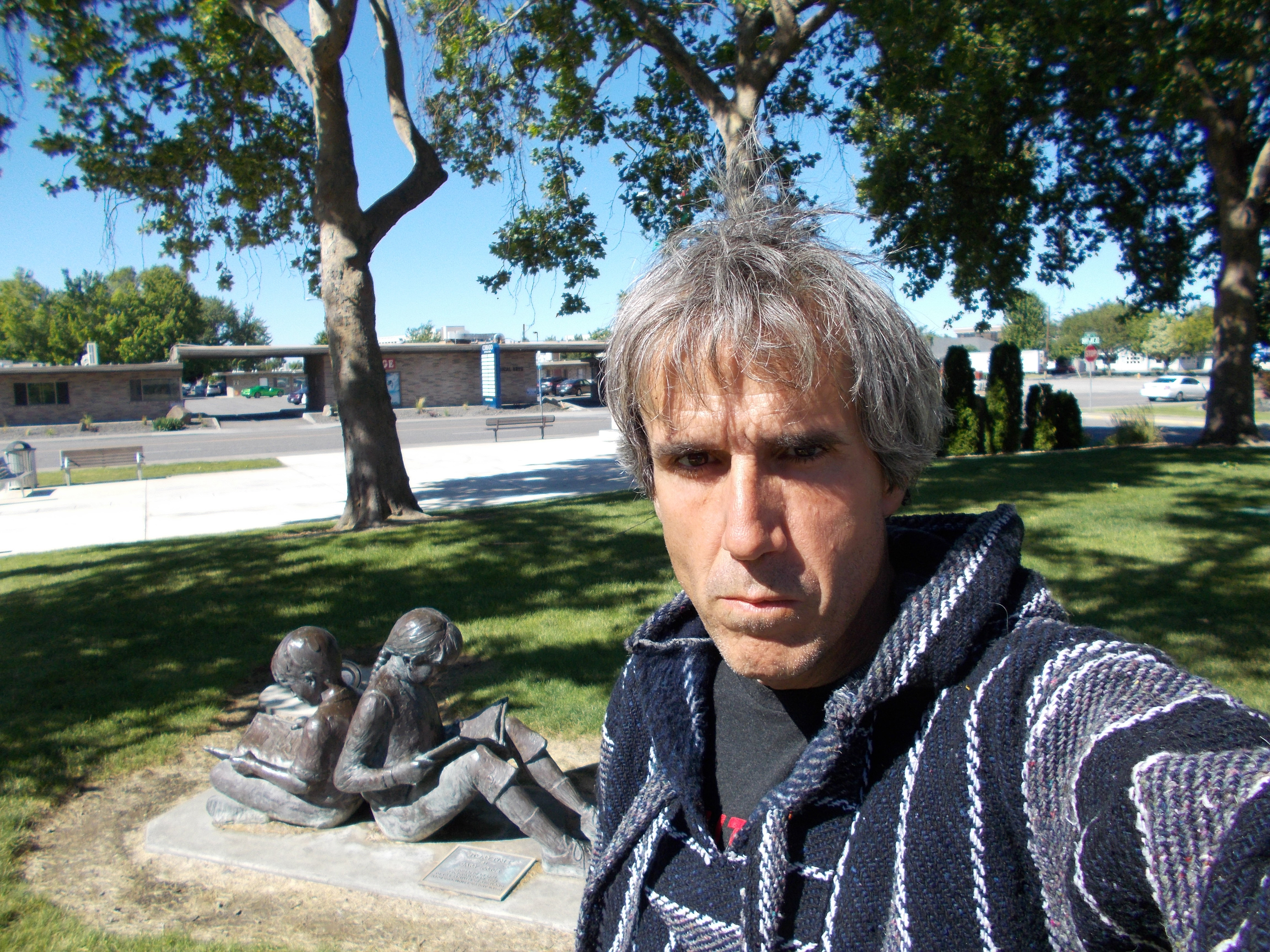
Davis in June 2018

In September 2018, OSNews editor Thom Holwerda wrote: "Davis was clearly a gifted programmer—writing an entire operating system is no small feat—and it was sad to see him affected by his mental illness". One fan described him as a "programming legend", while another, a computer engineer, compared the development of TempleOS to a skyscraper built by one person. The engineer had previously spoken to Davis at length and believed that Davis, had it not been for his illness, could have been a "Steve Jobs" or a "Steve Wozniak".

=== "Glowies" ===
Throughout his life, Davis believed that he was under constant persecution from federal agents, particularly those from the Central Intelligence Agency (CIA). He was controversial for his regular use of offensive slurs, including racist and homophobic epithets, and sometimes rebuked his critics as "CIA niggers". In one widely circulated YouTube video, he claimed that "the CIA niggers glow in the dark; you can see them if you're driving. You just run them over." Davis would also coin the term "glowie", which is based on the aforementioned phrase, and would later be used by various far-right online groups (most notably Iron March) to denote an undercover federal agent or informant. Psychologist Victoria Tischler doubted that Davis's intentions were violent or discriminatory, but "some of these antisocial behaviors became apparent" through his mental illness, which is "something really common to people with severe mental health problems."

Such outbursts, along with the operating system's "amateurish" presentation, ultimately caused TempleOS to become a frequent object of derision. Davis addressed concerns about his language on his website, stating that "when I fight Satan, I use the sharpest knives I can find".

== Death ==
During his final two months, Davis struggled with periods of homelessness and incarceration. He stopped taking medication because he believed that it limited his creativity. Some fans helped him by bringing him supplies, but he refused their housing offers. After living with his sister in Arizona, Davis traveled to California, and in April 2018, he stopped in Portland, Oregon. Police in the city of The Dalles, approximately 90 miles (140 km) east of Portland, were informed by locals about Davis. No further complaints were received about Davis.

"Terry Davis: Rises to Throne", a YouTube video uploaded by Davis hours before his death

In his final video, recorded on a bench at The Dalles Wasco County Library, and uploaded hours before his death, he explained that he had removed most of his videos because he did not wish to "litter" the Internet, and that he had learned how to "purify" himself. At the very end, he states: "It's good to be king. Wait, maybe. I think maybe I'm just like a little bizarre little person who walks back and forth. Whatever, you know, but..."

On the evening of August 11, 2018, while walking alongside railroad tracks in The Dalles, Davis was struck and killed by a Union Pacific Railroad train. Investigators could not determine whether his death was suicide or accidental. The police report stated that Davis was walking with his back toward the train and that he turned around before the moment of impact. When The Dalles Chronicle ran a story about an unnamed homeless man who was struck by a train, the newspaper was inundated with phone calls inquiring whether it was Davis, which the paper later confirmed in a follow-up piece.

=== Tributes ===
As reports of his death surfaced online, he was memorialized by fans in a number of tributes posted to social media. Through the TempleOS website, his family asked people to donate to organizations and charities in support of mental health. In December 2018, Linux.org, an unofficial community for Linux users, was vandalized by a hacker with a reference to his death. In November 2019, Davis was the subject of a 30-minute documentary on BBC Radio 4.

== See also ==
- Creativity and mental health
- Francis E. Dec
- Bill Landreth
- Religion and schizophrenia
