= Tortured artist =

Stock character

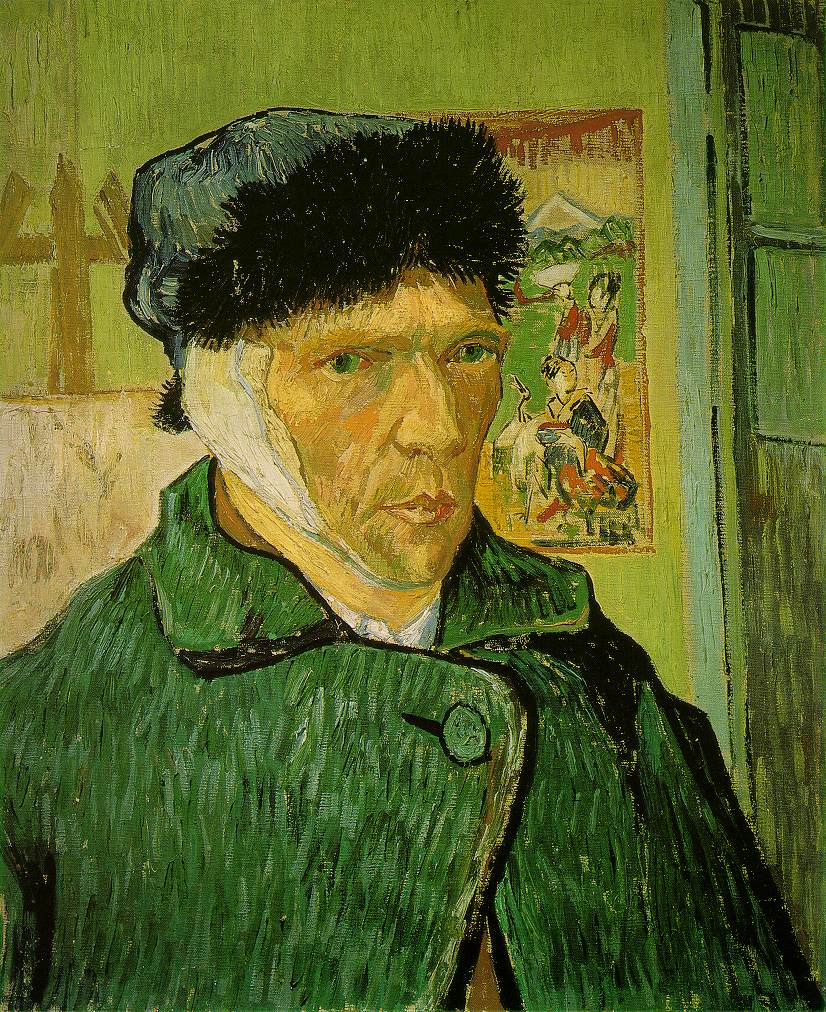
Vincent van Gogh, Self-portrait with Bandaged Ear, Easel and Japanese Print, January 1889. Van Gogh, who struggled with poverty and mental illness for most of his life, is regarded as a famous example of the tortured artist.

A tortured artist is a stock character and stereotype who is in constant torment due to frustrations with art, other people, or the world in general. The trope is often associated with mental illness.

== Background ==
The trope of the tortured artist is thought to have been started by Plato, however in reality this may be based on a misinterpretation of Plato's analysis of artistic inspiration as a form of 'divine madness.'

Creativity and mental illness have been connected over time. Some mental disorders, such as bipolar disorder and schizophrenia, have been said to have helped popular artists with their works. One of the most known "tortured artists" is Vincent van Gogh, who experts consider to have suffered from psychosis.

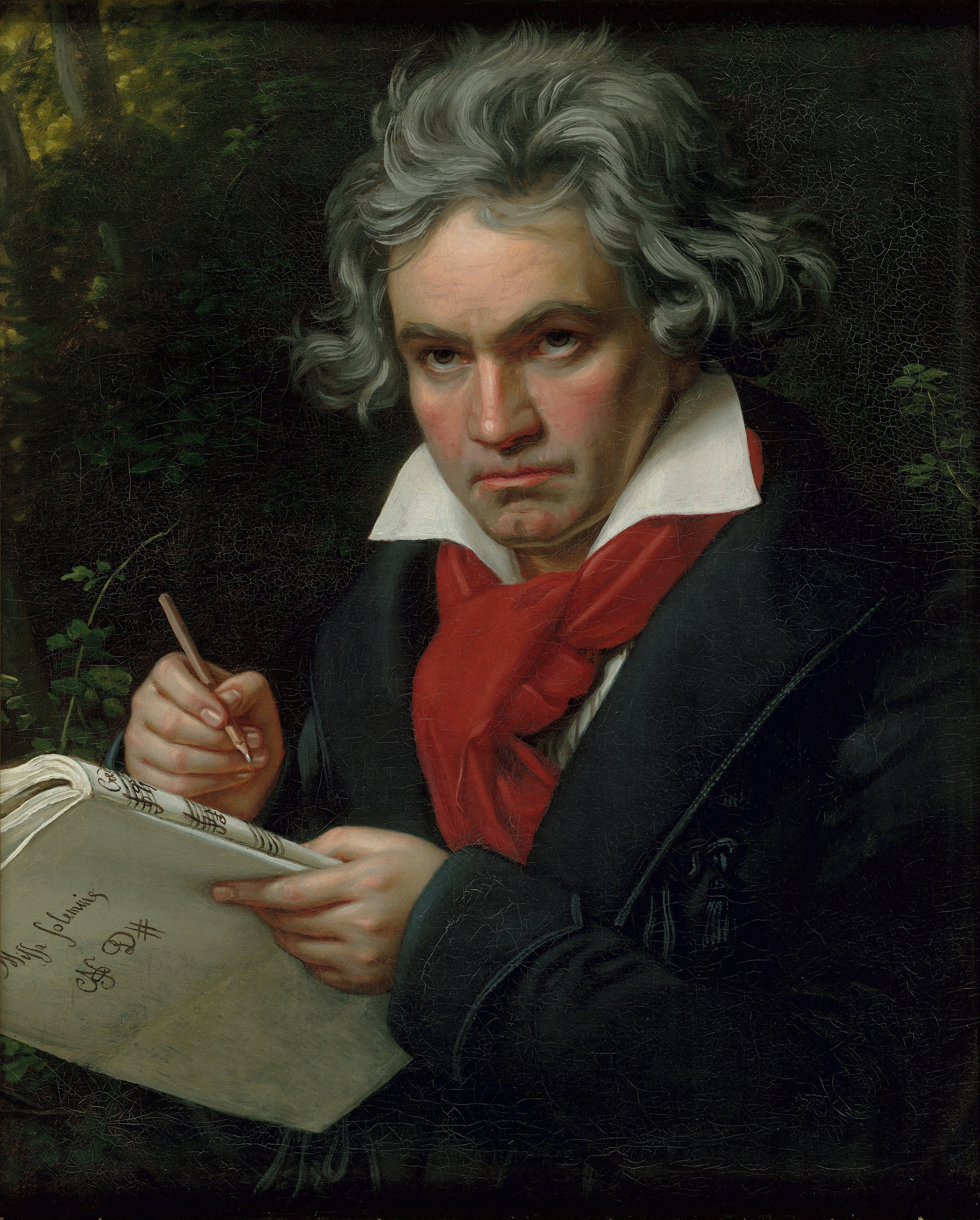
Ludwig van Beethoven, painted by Joseph Karl Stieler, painted in 1820, long after he began to lose his hearing and became reclusive.

Another figure matching the description of the "tortured artist" is Ludwig van Beethoven, who, after losing his hearing, became increasingly reclusive and apathetic towards society. In the Heiligenstadt Testament, Beethoven confesses his loss of hearing to his brothers Nikolaus and Kaspar and tells them of his inability to converse regularly anymore as well as his contemplation of suicide. Towards the end of his life, Beethoven used conversation books to interact with his friends and acquaintances.

Similarly, Brian Wilson of the Beach Boys struggled with severe mental health issues including schizoaffective disorder and auditory hallucinations, while producing some of the most acclaimed works in popular music. His long periods of isolation, emotional distress, and creative breakthroughs have led many writers and commentators to cite him as a modern example of the "tortured artist" archetype.

== Criticism and research ==
The trope has been criticized for romanticizing mental illness, treating it as a necessary ingredient for creativity. According to a study conducted at the University of Southampton, artwork is perceived to be superior if the observer is told that the artist is mentally ill. However, research has found that famous artists' less renowned work was produced when their mental illness was the most acute.

Multiple studies have found that rates of mental illness were several times greater than average in creative professions. According to Victoria Tischler of the University of West London, creative fields often have low wages and long working hours, leading to poor mental health.

== See also ==
- Poète maudit
- Self-destructive behaviour
- Starving artist
- Sylvia Plath effect
- 27 Club
