= TempleOS =

Biblically-themed operating system

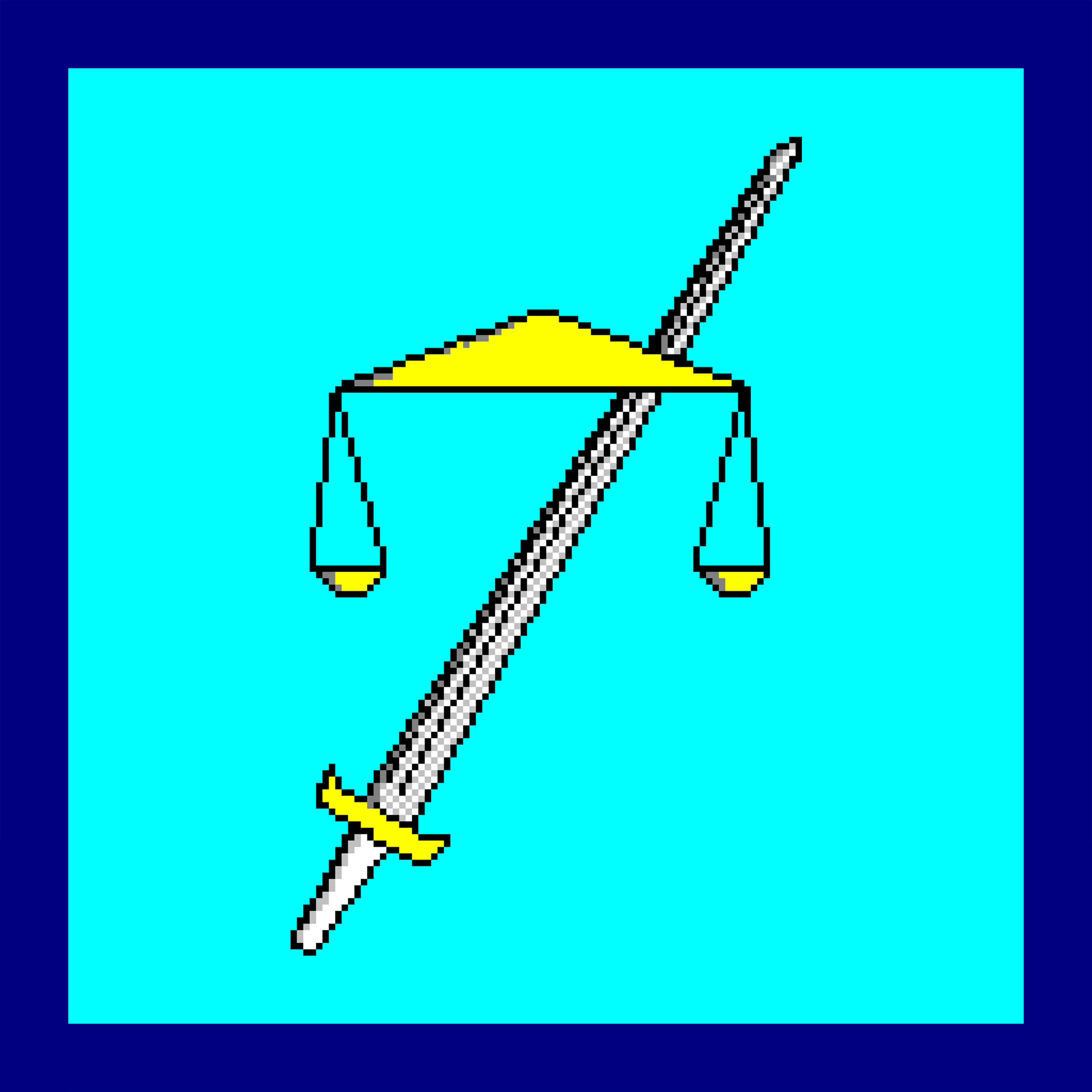

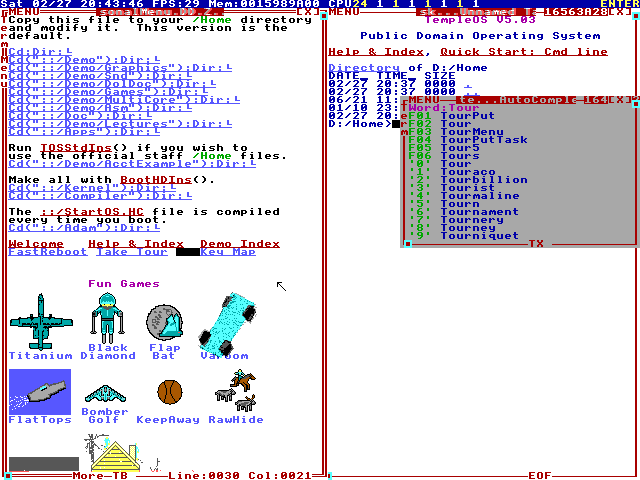
- TempleOS 5.03
- Developer: Terry A. Davis
- Written in: HolyC and x86 Assembly
- Working state: Finished
- Source model: Open-source
- Initial release: 2005; 21 years ago (as J Operating System) 2013; 13 years ago (as TempleOS)
- Latest release: 5.03 / November 20, 2017; 8 years ago
- Repository: github.com/cia-foundation/TempleOS
- Supported platforms: x64
- Kernel type: Monolithic userland = UserCmdLine using HolyC, Adam (purpose unknown)
- Default user interface: 16-color graphics, specifically created for TempleOS
- License: Public domain
- Official website: https://templeos.org

TempleOS (formerly J Operating System, LoseThos, and SparrowOS) is a Biblical-themed lightweight operating system (OS) designed to be the Third Temple from the Hebrew Bible. It was created by American computer programmer Terry A. Davis, who developed it alone over the course of a decade after a series of manic episodes that he later described as a revelation from God. TempleOS could be considered as an example of coding as an art form, with the nature of his psychological instability and its influence over the project lending to comparisons to similar outsider art.

The system was characterized as a modern x86-64 Commodore 64, using an interface similar to a mixture of DOS and Turbo C. Davis proclaimed that the system's features, such as its 640×480 resolution, 16-color display, and single-voice audio, were designed according to explicit instructions from God. It was programmed with a custom JIT variant of C (named HolyC) in place of BASIC, and included an original flight simulator, compiler, and kernel.

First released in 2005 as J Operating System, TempleOS was renamed in 2013 and was last updated in 2017 before Terry's death.

== Background ==
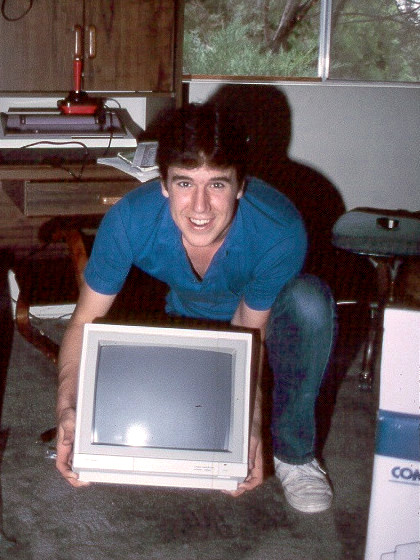
Davis, c. 1980s

Terry A. Davis was an electrical engineer from Wisconsin. He began developing TempleOS circa 1993. One of its early names was the "J Operating System" before renaming it to "LoseThos", a reference to a scene from the 1986 film Platoon. In 2008, Davis wrote that LoseThos was "primarily for making video games. It has no networking or Internet support. As far as I'm concerned, that would be reinventing the wheel". Another name he used was "SparrowOS" before settling on "TempleOS".

== System overview ==
TempleOS is a 64-bit, multi-core, cooperative multitasking operating system. It does not feature any preemption. All tasks must voluntarily yield. It was released into the public domain and has source code making it both libre software as well as open source software. It features no kernel-user separation, so all tasks must run in ring-0-only. All tasks share one single address space. TempleOS has no network drivers. It is fit for recreational programming. The OS uses 8-bit ASCII text and includes built-in 2D and 3D graphics libraries, running at 640×480 VGA resolution with 16 colors. It includes keyboard and mouse support. It supports ISO 9660, FAT32 and RedSea file systems (the latter created by Davis) with support for file compression. According to Davis, many of these specifications—such as the 640×480 resolution, 16-color display and single-voice audio—were directly requested of him by God. He explained that the limited resolution was to make it easier for children to draw illustrations for God.

The operating system includes an original flight simulator, compiler, and kernel. One bundled program, After Egypt, is a game in which the player travels to a burning bush to use a "high-speed stopwatch". The stopwatch is meant to act as an oracle that generates pseudorandom text, something Davis likened to a Ouija board and glossolalia. An example of generated text follows:

among consigned penally result perverseness checked stated held sensation reasonings skies adversity Dakota lip Suffer approached enact displacing feast Canst pearl doing alms comprehendeth nought

TempleOS was written in a programming language developed by Davis called "HolyC". Davis ultimately wrote over 100,000 lines of code for the OS.

== HolyC ==
HolyC
- Unofficial logo
- Paradigm: Imperative, Compiled
- Designed by: Terry A. Davis
- OS: TempleOS
- Filename extensions: .hc
- Website: templeos.org

Influenced by
- C, C++

HolyC (formerly C+), possibly a pun on Holy See, is a middle ground between the C and C++ programming languages with some unique differences, designed by Terry A. Davis specifically for TempleOS. It functions as both a general-purpose language for application development and a scripting language for automating tasks within TempleOS. HolyC is the just-in-time compiled language of TempleOS. It is an imperative, statically typed programming language, although it uses some object-oriented programming paradigms.

=== Syntax and features ===
HolyC shares much of its syntax with C but includes several deliberate differences tailored for its just-in-time compilation and integration with TempleOS.

- No main() function is required. Top-level expressions and statements outside of functions are executed sequentially during compilation, allowing HolyC to function as an interactive shell or REPL.
- Function addresses for callbacks or pointers require the explicit & operator preceding the function name (for example, &MyFunction). In standard C, a bare function name implicitly decays to a pointer.
- class declarations define aggregate types, supporting inheritance.
- Function-like macros, like #define MACRO(x) ..., are not supported.
- The switch statement supports range cases (e.g., case 0...10:).
- All integer types default to 64-bit behavior on access, with explicit casting functions such as ToI64().
- Support for inline x86 assembly blocks and direct hardware/register access, consistent with TempleOS's ring-0 design.
- Single compilation unit model with no separate linker: source files use the #include statements in "" form for file-relative modularity.

== Critical reception ==
TempleOS received mostly "sympathetic" reviews. Tech journalist David Cassel opined that "programming websites tried to find the necessary patience and understanding to accommodate Davis". TechRepublic and OSNews published positive articles on Davis's work, even though Davis was banned from the latter for hostile comments targeting its readers and staff. In his review for TechRepublic, James Sanders concluded that "TempleOS is a testament to the dedication and passion of one man displaying his technological prowess. It doesn't need to be anything more." OSNews editor Kroc Camen wrote that the OS "shows that computing can still be a hobby; why is everybody so serious these days? If I want to code an OS that uses interpretive dance as the input method, I should be allowed to do so, companies like Apple be damned." In 2017, the OS was shown as a part of an outsider art exhibition in Bourgogne, France.

== Legacy ==
After Davis' death in 2018, OSNews editor Thom Holwerda wrote: "Davis was clearly a gifted programmer – writing an entire operating system is no small feat – and it was sad to see him affected by his mental illness". One fan described Davis as a "programming legend", while another, a computer engineer, compared the development of TempleOS to a one-man-built skyscraper. He added that it "actually boggles my mind that one man wrote all that" and that it was "hard for a lay person to understand what a phenomenal achievement" it is to write an entire operating system alone.

== See also ==
- Creativity and mental health
- Biblical software
- Religion and video games
- Religion and schizophrenia
