= Claude-Hélène Mayer =

University professor

Prof. Dr. habil. Claude-Hélène Mayer PhD, PhD, MSc, M.A.
- Born: Göttingen, Germany
- Education: Magister Artium (M.A.), Georg-August-Universität, Doctor, Georg-August-Universität, Ph.D., Rhodes University, habil., Europa-Universität Viadrina, Ph.D. in Psychology, University of Pretoria, Master of Science, University of Portsmouth, Master of Science, Northumbria University
- Occupations: Professor, University of Johannesburg; Research Associate, Rhodes University
- Organizations: International Academy for Intercultural Research; International Association for Cross-Cultural Psychology; South African Board of People Practices; Systemische Gesellschaft; International Network for Positive Psychology
- Website: claudehmayer.com

Claude-Hélène Mayer is a German psychologist and professor in Industrial and Organisational Psychology at the Department of Industrial Psychology and People Management, University of Johannesburg, South Africa.

As a transdisciplinary researcher, she contributed to the research areas of intercultural conflict management and mediation, salutogenesis in the workplace, women in leadership, positive psychology and emotions, the Fourth Industrial Revolution, positive autoethnography, and psychobiography.

== Early life and education ==
Claude-Hélène Mayer was born in Göttingen, Germany. She completed her M.A. and Dr disc.pol. in Cultural Anthropology, Intercultural Didactics and Socio-Economics of Rural Development at the Georg-August-University. She furthered her qualifications at different institutions, with a MSc in psychology from Northumbria University in Newcastle, UK and a MSc in Crime Sciences, Investigation and Intelligence from Portsmouth University, UK. Moreover, she obtained a PhD in Psychology at the University of Pretoria and a PhD in Management at the university in Grahamstown, South Africa. Her habilitation is in Psychology, with focus on Work, Organisational and Cultural Psychology from the Europa-Universität Viadrina, Frankfurt (Oder), Germany.

== Career ==
Together with Paul Elovitz and Inna Rozentsvit, Mayer is one of the founding members of the International Psychobiography Group of the Psychohistory Forum. Additionally, she is an Editorial Board Member of Frontiers in Psychology, an Associate Regional Editor for the International Journal of Cross-Cultural Management, as well as a Senior Editor of Europe's Journal of Psychology. From 2011 to 2016, Mayer was the co-editor of the Series on Intercultural Mediation at Peter Lang together with Dominic Busch and Hartmut Schröder.

She has been elected a fellow of the International Academy for Intercultural Research. In 2022, Mayer was a faculty member of the Semester at Sea voyage.

== Research ==
Claude-Hélène Mayer's research has traversed several interconnected fields. In her early career, she concentrated on the application of salutogenesis in the realm of transcultural management, examining how managers comprehend and engage with the complexity of cultural dynamics and mental health within organizational settings. Her work aimed to deepen the understanding of salutogenesis and sense of coherence within intercultural contexts and its influence on intercultural competence and managerial well-being.

Mayer's research has extended to shaping practical applications for managerial training. She has authored manuals on developing salutogenesis and sense of coherence as health-promoting resources, with particular focus on intercultural dimensions within organizations. Her publications provide insights on systemic approaches, reflecting a commitment to fostering health and well-being across cultures.

In her recent work, Mayer concentrates on psychobiography, expanding the field towards a positive psychology approach. Mayer's psychobiographical focus has also extended to exploring the lives of prominent women leaders, such as Angela Merkel, and individuals from non-Western societies, such as Graça Machel.

Her current research continues to investigate the intersection of cultural influence and individual psychological experiences. Mayer has published work on topics such as shame, the Fourth Industrial Revolution, women in leadership, and psychobiography, where she emphasizes culture as a crucial factor in psychological research.

== Acknowledgements ==
Mayer's work has been acknowledged and awarded by multiple institutions, including:

=== Book Awards ===
Claude was a finalist for the Excellence Book Award for her book The Life and Creative Works of Paulo Coelho (Springer, Cham) in 2025. She has also received two Nautilus Book Award with special honor in academic rigor for the books Unwrapping Transcultural Romantic Love Relationships and Women's Empowerment for a Sustainable Future: Transcultural and Positive Psychology Perspectives. In 2023, she received the William B. Gudykunst Outstanding Book Award from the Intercultural Academy for International Research (IAIR) for the International Handbook of Love: Transcultural and Transdisciplinary Perspectives.

=== Best Paper Awards ===
In 2025, she received the Outstanding Article Award 2024 from the Global Listening Center, USA, for her article As women we learn to listen. In 2022, the paper "In Memory of Edward Diener: Reflections on his career, contributions and the science of happiness" won the Outstanding Best Paper Award at the Frontiers in Psychology (Positive Psychology) Editor's Choice Awards. Further, her conference article won the Best Qualitative Paper Award at the SAIMS (Southern Africa Institute for Management Scientists) Conference in Pretoria, for her work on "China in Africa" together with Professor Lynette Louw et al. Finally, she was nominated for the Outstanding Paper Award at the Eastern Academy of Management International Conference in Rio de Janeiro, for the paper Cross-cultural health management in South Africa. Health professionals' challenges in managing HIV/AIDS (with L. Louw) in 2009.

=== Top Researcher Awards ===
Claude was the winner of the Higher Education Women Leadership Award (HEWLA) in the category "Women in Humanities and Social Sciences”. In 2026, Claude received the Outstanding Researcher Award at the University of Johannesburg, after she won the CBE Top Researcher Award in 2020, 2021, 2022, 2024, and 2025. She further received the Graduating Students Award in 2021 and 2022 at the same institution. She was rated world's top 2% scientist 2025 and 2026.

== Selected works ==
=== Positive Autoethnography, Intercultural Autoethnography, Therapeutic Autoethnography ===
- Gonot-Schoupinsky, F. & Mayer, C.-H. (2025). Positive Autoethnography. An Introduction to Theory and Practice. Emerald Publishing Limited.
- Mayer, C.-H., Govender, A. & Ramalepe, P. R. (2025). Intercultural Autoethnographies. Voices of South African Gen Z. Emerald Group Publishing.

=== Research projects ===
- Holm-Hadulla, R. M., Mayer, C. H., Wendler, H., Kremer, T. L., Kotera, Y., & Herpertz, S. C. (2022). Fear, depression, and well-being during COVID-19 in German and South African students: A cross-cultural comparison. Frontiers in psychology, 13, 920125.
- Holm-Hadulla, R. M., Hofmann, F. H., Sperth, M., & Mayer, C. H. (2021). Creativity and Psychopathology: An Interdisciplinary View. Psychopathology, 54(1), 39–46.

=== Psychobiography ===
- Mayer, C.-H., van Niekerk, R., Bainai, M. (2025). Psychobiographies Of Political Leaders From Across The World. Cham, Switzerland: Palgrave Macmillian.
- Mayer, C.-H.; van Niekerk, R., Fouché, P.J. & Ponterotto, J. (2023). Beyond WEIRD: Psychobiography in Times of Transcultural and Transdisciplinary Perspectives. Cham, Switzerland: Springer.
- Mayer, C.-H., Fouché, P.J., & van Niekerk, R. (2021). Psychobiographical illustrations on meaning and identity in sociocultural contexts. Sociocultural Psychology of the Lifecourse Series. Cham, Switzerland: Palgrave Macmillian.
- Krasovska, N. & Mayer, C.-H. (2021). A psychobiography of Viktor E. Frankl. Using adversity for life transformation. Springer Briefs in Psychology. Cham, Switzerland: Springer Briefs.
- Mayer, C.-H. & Kovary, Z. (2019). New Trends in Psychobiography. Cham, Switzerland: Springer.
- Mayer, C.-H. (2017). The life and creative works of Paulo Coelho. A Psychobiography from a Positive Psychology Perspective. Cham, Switzerland: Springer.

=== Emotions ===
- Mayer, C.-H., Banai, M. & Stefanidis, A. (2025). Cross-cultural perspectives on sentiments and leadership. International Journal of Cross Cultural Management, 25(1).
- Vanderheiden, E. & Mayer, C.-H. (2024). The Palgrave Handbook of Humour Research. 2nd updated edition. Cham, Switzerland: Palgrave Macmillian.
- Vanderheiden, E. & Mayer, C.-H. (2024). Shame and Aging in a Transforming World. Cham: Springer.
- Vanderheiden, E. & Mayer, C.-H. (2024). Shame and Gender in Transcultural Contexts. Resourceful Investigations. Cham: Springer.
- Mayer, C.-H. & Vanderheiden, E. (2023). Love and Culture. Meaningful Investigations. International Review of Psychiatry, 35(1).
- Mayer, C.-H. (2023). Unwrapping transcultural romantic love relationships. Sense of coherence and identity development in cultural perspectives. SpringerBriefs in Psychology. Cham: Springer.
- Mayer, C.-H. & Vanderheiden, E. & Wong, P.T. (2021). Shame 4.0. Investigating an Emotion in Digital Worlds and the Fourth Industrial Revolution. Cham, Switzerland: Springer.
- Mayer, C.-H. & Vanderheiden, E. (2021). International Handbook of Love. Transcultural and transdisciplinary discourses. Cham, Switzerland: Springer.
- Mayer, C.-H. & Vanderheiden, E. (2019). The Bright Side of Shame. Transforming and growing through practical applications in cultural contexts. Cham, Switzerland: Springer.
- Vanderheiden, E. & Mayer, C.-H. (2017). The Value of Shame - Exploring a Health Resource in Cultural Contexts. Cham, Switzerland: Springer.

=== Salutogenesis ===
- Mayer, C.-H. (2024). Salutogenesis. In: Mockaitis, A.I. & Butler, C.L. (eds.). Elgar Encyclopedia of Cross-Cultural Management (pp. 130–132). Cheltenham, UK: Edward Elgar Publishing.
- Braun-Lewensohn, O. & Mayer, C.-H. (2020). Salutogenesis and coping: Ways to overcome stress and conflicts. Special Issue. International Journal of Environmental Research and Public Health.
- Mayer, C.-H. & Boness, C.M. (2013). Creating mental health across cultures. Coaching and training for managers. Lengerich: Pabst Publishers.
- Krause, C. & Mayer, C.-H. (2012). Gesundheitsressourcen erkennen und fördern. Ein Trainingsprogramm für pädagogische Fachkräfte. Göttingen: V&R.
- Mayer, C.-H. (2011). The meaning of Sense of Coherence in Transcultural Management. Internationale Hochschulschriften Series. Münster: Waxmann.

=== Intercultural conflict and mediation ===
- Mayer, C.-H. (2020). Intercultural Mediation and Conflict Management Training. A Guide for Professionals and Academics. Cham, Switzerland: Springer International.
- Lindemann, H., Mayer, C.-H. & Osterfeld, I. (2020). Systemisch-lösungsorientierte Mediation und Konfliktklärung. Ein Lehr-, Lern- und Arbeitsbuch für Ausbildung und Praxis. 2nd edition. Göttingen: Vandenhoeck & Ruprecht.
- Mayer, C.-H. (2019). Trainingshandbuch Interkulturelle Mediation und Konfliktlösung. 3. Überarbeitete und aktualisierte Auflage. Münster: Waxmann.

=== Fourth Industrial Revolution ===
- Mayer, C.-H. (2024). Leaders’ views on leadership and skills development in the Fourth Industrial Revolution. SA Journal of Industrial Psychology, 50, 11 pages.
- Noriega Del Valle, M., Łaba, K., & Mayer, C-H. (2024). Unlocking technology acceptance among South African employees: A psychological perspective. SA Journal of Industrial Psychology/SA Tydskrif vir Bedryfsielkunde, 50(0), a2177.
- Mayer, C.-H., Oosthuizen, R.M. & Vanderheiden, E. (2024). Transformational Competences and the Fourth Industrial Revolution. Special Issue. Frontiers in Psychology, 15.
- Mayer, C.-H. & Vanderheiden, E. (2020). Positive Psychology during the 4th Industrial revolution. New discourses in social and cultural perspectives.
- Guest editors: Claude-Helene Mayer and Elisabeth Vanderheiden. Special Issue. International Review of Psychiatry, 32 (7-8), 2020.
- Mayer, C.-H. & Vanderheiden, E. (2020). Positive Psychology during the 4th Industrial revolution. New discourses in social and cultural perspectives. Guest editors: Claude-Helene Mayer and Elisabeth Vanderheiden. Special Issue. International Review of Psychiatry, 32 (7-8), 2020.

=== Positive Psychology ===
- Wong PTP, Ho LS, Mayer C-H, Yang F & Cowden RG (2023). A new science of suffering, the wisdom of the soul, and the new behavioral economics of happiness: towards a general theory of well-being. Frontiers in Psychology 14.
- Duan, W., Klibert, J., Schotanus-Dijkstra, M., Llorens, S., van der Heuvel, M., Mayer, C.-H., Tomasulo, D., Liao, Y., van Zyl, L.E. (2022). Editorial: positive psychological interventions: How, when and why they work: Beyond WEIRD contexts. Frontiers in Psychology.
- Mayer, C.-H. (2022). Positive and Existential Psychology in Times of Change: Towards complex, holistic, systemic and integrative perspectives. nt. J. Environ. Res. Public Health 2022, 19(14), 8433.
