= An Unquiet Mind =

1995 memoir by Kay Redfield Jamison

An Unquiet Mind: A memoir of moods and madness
- Author: Kay Redfield Jamison
- Language: English
- Genre: Memoir
- Published: September 18, 1995
- Publisher: Alfred A. Knopf, Inc. (1995) Vintage Books (1997)
- Publication place: United States
- Pages: 227
- ISBN: 978-0679763307
- OCLC: 957172091

An Unquiet Mind: A Memoir of Moods and Madness is a memoir written by American clinical psychologist and bipolar disorder researcher Kay Redfield Jamison and published in 1995. The book details Jamison's experience with bipolar disorder and how it affected her in various areas of her life from childhood up until the writing of the book. Narrated in the first person, the book shows the effect of manic-depressive illness in family and romantic relationships, professional life, and self-awareness, and highlights both the detrimental effects of the illness and the few positive ones. The book was originally published in hardcover by Alfred A. Knopf, Inc. in New York and reprinted by Vintage Books in paperback in 1997.

== Synopsis ==
=== Part 1: The Wild Blue Yonder ===
Jamison describes her childhood as part of a military family with a conservative upbringing and the need to make new friends after every relocation. She recalls a happy childhood and a supportive family. Her father was creative and charismatic; her mother was kind and resourceful. During adolescence Jamison was intellectually drawn to the practice of science and medicine, later shifting to psychology. When her family moved to California, her family life deteriorated, as her father's depressive episodes increased, while her mother pursued professional goals. During her senior year of high school, Jamison underwent her first episode of hypomania, followed by a period of depression, nonetheless passing as neurotypical. Some time later Jamison started her undergraduate studies at UCLA, having committed to clinical psychology as her career path. After finishing her undergraduate studies, Jamison earned a Ph.D. in clinical psychology from UCLA and became a professor in the Department of Psychiatry.

=== Part 2: A Not So Fine Madness ===
Jamison describes her episodes of mania and how the heightened energy made her more socially adept at work and efficient in her work responsibilities. On the other hand, she became irritable and restless in her marriage, leading to a separating from her husband. She also became reckless in spending, leading to her brother's role in untangling her financial situation. Jamison describes her inability to focus on reading a single paragraph or listening to a song from beginning to end. Eventually, she sought treatment for the first time; a colleague suggested that she try lithium to moderate her manic episodes. Jamison then began to work with a psychiatrist, and psychotherapy became a part of her routine for the rest of her life.

Against medical advice, Jamison went off lithium several times, sometimes to avoid its side effects, but often due to denial about her diagnosis as bipolar. During a severe depressive episode, Jamison made a suicide attempt by overdosing lithium. She survives the suicide attempt, due to a fortunate phone call from her brother, who noticed her slurring words and called for help. Jamison describes many who cared for her and resolved to monitor her behavior closely during her manic episodes. Months after her suicide attempt, Jamison founded the Affective Disorders Clinic and applied for tenure at UCLA, which she won.

=== Part 3: This Medicine, Love ===
Jamison narrates major events in her romantic life. After the end of her first marriage, she falls in love and starts dating a man named David, a British psychiatrist with the Army Medical Corps. After spending a few days together where she lived in L.A., they spend several weeks in London which made her "remember how important love is to life". David was to her always loving, kind, and reassuring, and Jamison admits to enjoying life like she hadn't for years. After she returns to LA, David is posted to an army hospital in Hong Kong, where he plans for her to meet him. Before this can happen, however, a diplomatic courier comes to her house with the news that David had died of a massive heart attack while in duty. Jamison retells her months of grief about David's death, from feeling numb and detached during the funeral in London at first, to breaking down in the British Airways counter when they asked her the reason of her visit, to being able to remember David with fondness without regretting the future they'd lost.

Once back home, Jamison has an adjustment to her lithium levels, which greatly diminished the side effects without removing its effectiveness against the symptoms of bipolar disorder. Some time after, she meets Richard Wyatt, the man that would become her second husband and with whom she shares a more "opposites attract" relationship, which led to a rapidly evolving relationship that led her to leave her tenure position at UCLA to live in Washington with him.

=== Part 4: An Unquiet Mind ===
Jamison talks about the renaming of her disease from manic-depressive illness to bipolar disorder, and rebels against the change, arguing that the new name is not descriptive enough of the disease and suggests a separation between depression and manic-depressive illness which is not always clear or accurate.

She tells her account of witnessing the first evidence of a genetic component to bipolar disease, and sitting with Jim Watson talking about mood disorders and family trees. After this genetic connection is made, Jamison talks about her struggle with her desire to have children. Later she recounts the recommendation of a physician she saw once to not have any because of her disease. Jamison calls not having her own children "the single most intolerable regret of [her] life", but describes her relationship with her niece and nephew and how she enjoys it.

In her new life in Washington, Jamison starts working in the Department of Psychiatry at the Johns Hopkins Medical School. She is apprehensive to disclose her illness to her new coworkers but does so to not jeopardize the care of her patients and make her superiors aware of the legal risk. Despite her fears, she describes being very accepted and supported in her work environment in Hopkins, as well as maintaining an optimistic view of the future of her illness.

== Reception ==
The book received a positive reception, with Jamison being praised for her bravery.

In 2009, Melody Moezzi, an Iranian-American attorney who is diagnosed with bipolar disorder, reviewed An Unquiet Mind for National Public Radio. She described the memoir as "the most brilliant and brutally honest book I've ever read about bipolar disorder". Moezzi stated that "an unquiet mind need not be a deficient one".

A 2011 review in The Guardian held that An Unquiet Mind has been unrivaled in its honesty about life with bipolar disorder.

== Publication history ==
The book was originally published in hardcover by Alfred A. Knopf, Inc. in New York and reprinted by Vintage Books in paperback in 1997.
