= Sylvia Plath effect =

Phenomenon of poets being more susceptible to mental illness

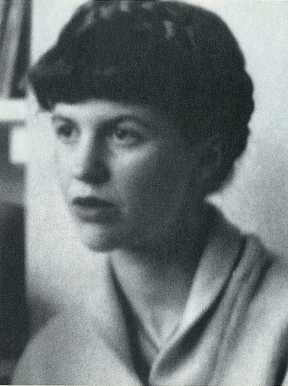
Sylvia Plath

The Sylvia Plath effect is the phenomenon that poets are more susceptible to mental illness than other creative writers. The term was coined in 2001 by psychologist James C. Kaufman, and implications and possibilities for future research are discussed. The effect is named after author Sylvia Plath, who died by suicide at the age of 30.

Building on the more general research that, from early adolescence through adulthood, women are twice as likely as men to experience depression, Kaufman's work further demonstrated that female poets were more likely to experience mental illness than any other class of writers. In addition, female poets were more likely to be mentally ill than other eminent women, such as politicians, actresses, and artists.

Although many studies (e.g., Andreasen, 1987; Jamison, 1989; Ludwig, 1995) have demonstrated that creative writers are prone to mental illness, this relationship has not been examined in depth.

Kaufman himself wrote an editorial for Europe’s Journal of Psychology classifying his essay as inaccurate and stated "As I matured and studied more aspects of creativity, I was less thrilled about the Sylvia Plath Effect legacy [...] I made several arguments against the importance of my own work".

Plath's illness and suicide have spawned many articles in scientific journals, but almost all have been focused on issues of psychodynamic explanation and have been unsuccessful in dealing directly with the clinical history and diagnosis. The view has been broadly proliferated that hers was a typical bipolar disorder.

== Supporting evidence ==
In one study, 1,629 writers were analyzed for signs of mental illness. Female poets were found to be significantly more likely to experience mental illness than female fiction writers or male writers of any type. Another study extended the analysis to 520 eminent women (poets, fiction writers, non-fiction writers, visual artists, politicians, and actresses), and again found the poets to be significantly more likely to experience mental illness.

In another study performed by the Department of Psychiatry at the University of Kentucky Medical Center, female writers were found to be more likely to suffer not only from mood disorders, but also from panic attacks, general anxiety, drug abuse, and eating disorders. The rates of multiple mental disorders were also higher among these writers. Although it was not explored in depth, abuse during childhood (physical or sexual) also loomed as a possible contributor to psychological issues in adulthood. The cumulative psychopathology scores of subjects, their reported exposure to abuse during childhood, mental difficulties in their mothers, and the combined creativity scores of their parents represented significant predictors of their illnesses. The high rates of certain emotional disorders in female writers suggested a direct relationship between creativity and psychopathology, but the relationships were not clear-cut. As the results of the predictive analysis indicated, familial and environmental factors also appeared to play a role.

== Sylvia Plath and her death ==
After several suicide attempts, John Horder (her close friend) felt Plath was at risk of further harm and prescribed her anti-depressants mere days before Plath took her own life. He also visited with her daily and made many attempts to have her admitted to a hospital. Upon her refusal, he made arrangements for a live-in nurse.

Some critics have argued that because anti-depressants usually take up to three weeks to take effect, her prescription from Horder may not have been of any help. Others say that Plath's American doctor had warned her never again to take the anti-depressant drug prescribed by Horder as it was found to worsen her depression, but he supposedly prescribed it under a proprietary name which she did not recognize.

Plath, on February 11, 1963, was found dead of carbon monoxide poisoning in her kitchen after putting her head in the oven. She sealed the rooms between the kitchen and her sleeping children with wet towels and cloths.

== List of writers with mental illness ==
Female writers

- Naima El Bezaz (1974–2020), author and essayist
- Isabella Blow (1958–2007), magazine editor
- Iris Chang (1968–2004), author and journalist
- Elise Cowen (1933–1962), poet
- Petya Dubarova (1962–1979), poet
- Florbela Espanca (1894–1930), poet
- Zelda Fitzgerald (1900–1948), novelist, painter, and playwright
- Janet Frame (1924–2004), novelist and poet
- Martha Gellhorn (1908–1998), novelist and journalist
- Charlotte Perkins Gilman (1860–1935), novelist and poet
- Ingrid Jonker (1933–1965), poet
- Sarah Kane (1971–1999), playwright and screenwriter
- Michelle McNamara (1970–2016), author
- Eleanor Marx (1855–1898), translator and activist
- Alda Merini (1931–2009), author and poet
- Dorothy Miles (1931–1993), poet and activist
- Christiana Morgan (1897–1967), artist, author, and psychologist
- Alejandra Pizarnik (1936–1972), poet
- Sylvia Plath (1932–1963), poet and novelist
- Kay Sage (1898–1963), poet and artist
- Sanmao (1943–1991), author and translator
- Anne Sexton (1928–1974), poet
- Irina Slavina (1973–2020), journalist and editor
- Jean Stein (1934–2017), author and editor
- Alfonsina Storni (1892–1938), poet and playwright
- Sara Teasdale (1884–1933), poet
- Marina Tsvetayeva (1892–1941), poet
- Assia Wevill (1927–1969), poet
- Virginia Woolf (1882–1941), novelist, short-story writer, and essayist

Male writers

- Ryūnosuke Akutagawa (1892–1927), short-story writer
- John Berryman (1914–1972), poet and scholar
- Richard Brautigan (1935–1984), novelist, poet, and short-story writer
- Anton Chekhov (1860–1904), playwright and short-story writer
- Hart Crane (1899–1932), poet
- Osamu Dazai (1909–1948), novelist and short-story writer
- F. Scott Fitzgerald (1896–1940), novelist, essayist, screenwriter, and short-story writer
- Ernest Hemingway (1899–1961), novelist, short-story writer, and journalist
- Robert E. Howard (1906–1936), novelist and short-story writer
- Randall Jarrell (1914–1965), author and poet
- Arthur Koestler (1905–1983), novelist and essayist
- Walter Benjamin (1892–1940), essayist, philosopher, and theorist
- Ross Lockridge Jr. (1914–1948), novelist
- Tadeusz Borowski (1922–1951), author, journalist, and poet
- Guy de Maupassant (1850–1893), short-story writer, novelist, and poet
- Gérard de Nerval (1808–1855), poet, short-story writer, and translator
- Friedrich Nietzsche (1844–1900), philosopher, poet and composer
- Breece D'J Pancake (1952–1979), short-story writer
- Edgar Allan Poe (1809–1849), poet, short-story writer, and essayist
- Antero de Quental (1842–1891), author and poet
- Delmore Schwartz (1913–1966), poet and short-story writer
- Edward Stachura (1937–1979), author, poet, and translator
- Dylan Thomas (1914–1953), author and poet
- John Kennedy Toole (1937–1969), novelist
- David Foster Wallace (1962–2008), novelist, short-story writer, and essayist
- Andrew Waterhouse (1958–2001), poet and musician
- Yun Hyon-seok (1984–2003), author, poet, and activist
- Hunter S. Thompson (1937–2005), author and journalist
- Joost Zwagerman (1963–2015), author, poet, and essayist
- Erich Loest (1926–2013), author
- Ned Vizzini (1981–2013), author
- Marcin Wrona (1973–2015), screenwriter and director
- Mark Fisher (1968–2017), author, philosopher, and theorist
- Silvio Horta (1974–2020), screenwriter
- Shel Silverstein (1930–1999), author, poet, and cartoonist
- William Styron (1925–2006), novelist and essayist

== See also ==
- Creativity and mental illness
- Touched with Fire, a book about this topic
- Doki Doki Literature Club!, a game about poetry and mental illness
