= Touched with Fire (film) =

- Theatrical release poster
- Directed by: Paul Dalio
- Written by: Paul Dalio
- Produced by: Jeremy Alter, p.g.a. Kristina Nikolova, p.g.a. Jason Sokoloff
- Starring: Katie Holmes; Luke Kirby; Griffin Dunne; Bruce Altman; Christine Lahti
- Cinematography: Alexander Stanishev; Kristina Nikolova
- Edited by: Paul Dalio; Lee Percy
- Music by: Paul Dalio
- Production company: 40 Acres and a Mule Filmworks
- Distributed by: Roadside Attractions
- Release dates: March 15, 2015 (SXSW); February 12, 2016 (United States)
- Running time: 110 minutes
- Country: United States
- Language: English
- Box office: $146,487

Touched with Fire is a 2015 American drama film directed and written by Paul Dalio and starring Katie Holmes, Luke Kirby, Christine Lahti, Griffin Dunne and Bruce Altman. The film is about two bipolar poets who meet in a psychiatric hospital and fall in love. The film was released on February 12, 2016, by Roadside Attractions. It 'draws' on the book of the same name by Kay Redfield Jamison, and the book features in the plot.

== Cast ==
- Katie Holmes as Carla
- Luke Kirby as Marco
- Christine Lahti as Sara
- Griffin Dunne as George
- Bruce Altman as Donald
- Alex Manette as Eddy
- Edward Gelbinovich as Nick Quadri
- Daniel Gerroll as Dr. Lyon
- Genevieve Adams as Susan
- Rob Leo Roy as Gary
- Joseph Adams as Dr. Bailey
- Kay Redfield Jamison as herself

== Production ==
The filming began on April 10, 2013, in New York City.

== Release ==
The film premiered at South by Southwest on March 15, 2015. Roadside Attractions acquired the US distribution rights to the film on May 19, 2015. The film was released on February 12, 2016, by Roadside Attractions.

== Reception ==
On the review aggregator website Rotten Tomatoes, 67% of 52 critics' reviews are positive. Metacritic, which uses a weighted average, assigned the film a score of 62 out of 100, based on 17 critics, indicating "generally favorable" reviews.
