= Religion and schizophrenia =

The relationship between religion and schizophrenia is of particular interest to psychiatrists because of the similarities between religious experiences and psychotic episodes. Religious experiences often involve reports of auditory and/or visual phenomena, which is similar to those with schizophrenia who also commonly report hallucinations and delusions. These symptoms may resemble the events found within a religious experience. However, the people who report these religious visual and audio hallucinations also claim to have not perceived them with their five senses, rather, they conclude these hallucinations were an entirely internal process.

This differs from schizophrenia, where the person is unaware that their own thoughts or inner feelings are not happening outside of them. They report hearing, seeing, smelling, feeling, or tasting something that deludes them to believe it is real. They are unable to distinguish between reality and hallucinations because they experience these hallucinations with their bodily senses that leads them to perceive these events as happening outside of their mind. In general, religion has been found to have "both a protective and a risk increasing effect" for schizophrenia.

A common report from those with schizophrenia is some type of religious belief that many medical practitioners consider to be delusional—such as the belief that they are possessed by demons, that a god is talking to them, that they themselves are divine beings, or that they are prophets. Active and adaptive coping skills in subjects with residual schizophrenia are associated with a sound spiritual, religious, or personal belief system.

Trans-cultural studies have found that such beliefs are much more common in patients who also identify as Christian and/or reside in predominately Christian areas such as Europe or North America. By comparison, patients in Japan much more commonly have delusions surrounding matters of shame and slander, and in Pakistan matters of paranoia regarding relatives and neighbors.

== Background ==
Schizophrenia is a complex psychotic disorder in which symptoms include emotional blunting, intellectual deterioration, social isolation, disorganized speech and behavior, delusions, and hallucinations. The causes of schizophrenia are unclear, but it seems that genetics play a heavy role, as individuals with a family history are far more likely to suffer from schizophrenia.

The disorder can be triggered and exacerbated by social and environmental factors, with episodes becoming more apparent in periods of high stress. Neurologists have found that the schizophrenic brain has larger ventricles (fluid-filled cavities) compared to a non-schizophrenic brain. This is hypothesized to be due to loss of nerve cells. Symptoms usually appear around the onset of early adulthood.

It is rare for a child to be diagnosed with schizophrenia, in part because of the difficulty in establishing what erroneous thoughts and beliefs can be attributed to childhood development and which thoughts and beliefs can be attributed to schizophrenia. With psychiatric medication (usually antipsychotics) and therapy, individuals with schizophrenia can live successful and productive lives.

== Role of religion in schizophrenia treatment ==
It has been shown in longitudinal studies that those suffering from schizophrenia have varying degrees of success when religion plays a significant role in their recovery. It would seem that the use of religion can either be a helpful method of coping with the disorder, or it can be a significant hindrance in recovery. Especially for those who are active in a religious community, religion can also be a very valuable tool in coping with the disorder. It can be difficult, however, to distinguish if a religious experience is genuine to the spiritual person, or if it is a positive symptom of the illness.

In such cases, a skilled and reliable therapist can help. But, a specific requirement would be that a therapist is open to the use of religion in one's treatment, and that the patient is open and receiving said treatment, it is entirely possible to tie religion in with professional therapeutic aids and medication in order to meet a desirable goal. Those who are involved in church and are spiritual on a daily basis, while getting psychiatric treatment have reported fewer symptoms and a better quality of life. They learn to see their religion as a source of hope rather than a tormenting reality.

== Religion as a trigger for schizophrenia ==
Schizophrenia can be triggered by a variety of environmental factors, including significant stress, intensely emotional situations, and disturbing or uncomfortable experiences. It is possible that religion can sometimes be a trigger for schizophrenia in those who are vulnerable. Religious imagery is often very grandiose, and beckons a large personal change within an individual. This could potentially lead to a psychotic episode due to the shift in realistic thinking. A sufferer may believe that they themselves are a deity or messiah.

These symptoms may cause violent behavior, either toward others or the patient themselves. In some instances, they may also experience distressing symptoms if they believe a god is inducing illness as punishment. The patient may refuse treatment based on religious speculation. In certain instances, one might believe that the delusions and hallucinations are a divine experience, and therefore deny medical treatment.

== Works ==
- The Three Christs of Ypsilanti

== See also ==
- Anneliese Michel
- God complex
- Jerusalem syndrome
- Mental health of Jesus
- Messiah complex
- Paranoid schizophrenia
- Psychology of religion
- Religious delusion
- Terry A. Davis, American programmer diagnosed with schizophrenia who attributed his work to religious revelations
  - TempleOS, operating system designed by Davis as the Third Temple from Judeo-Christian eschatology
- Steven Waterhouse
- Evolution of schizophrenia
