= Touched with Fire (book) =

Book by Kay Redfield Jamison

- Author: Kay Redfield Jamison
- Language: English
- Subject: Creativity and bipolar disorder
- Publisher: Free Press
- Publication date: 1996
- ISBN: 978-0-684-83183-1
- OCLC: 85753373

Touched with Fire: Manic-Depressive Illness and the Artistic Temperament is a book by the American psychologist Kay Redfield Jamison examining the relationship between bipolar disorder and artistic creativity. It contains extensive case studies of historic writers, artists, and composers assessed as probably having had cyclothymia, major depressive disorder, or manic-depressive/bipolar disorder.

== Reception ==
The book has widely been very favourably received. It has been the basis for scholarship on the topic of the relationship between bipolar disorder and 'artistic temperament'.

== Cultural references ==
The film of the same name, directed and written by Paul Dalio (who is bipolar), 'draws from' the book and the book is a significant feature in its plot.

== See also ==
- Creativity and bipolar disorder
- Creativity and mental illness
