= Paul Dalio =

American screenwriter

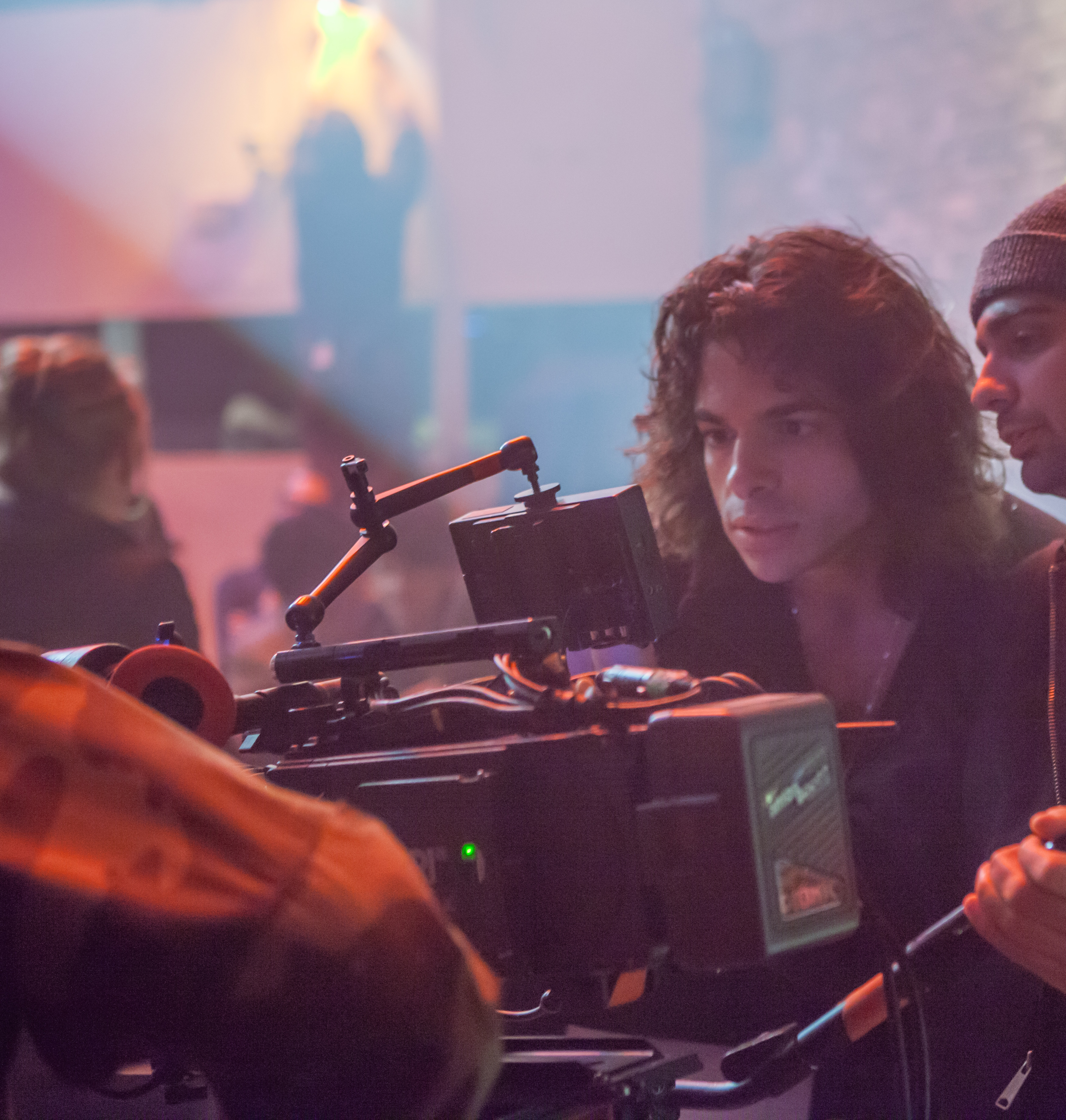
- Born: December 8, 1979 (age 46)
- Education: St. Luke's School; NYU Tisch School of the Arts
- Occupations: Director, screenwriter, composer
- Years active: 2012–present
- Known for: Touched with Fire
- Spouse: Kristina Nikolova
- Children: 2
- Parent: Ray Dalio

Paul Dalio (born December 8, 1979) is an American screenwriter, director and composer. His first film, Touched with Fire, was inspired by his struggles overcoming bipolar disorder, and premiered at SXSW in March 2015 and was released theatrically in February 2016.

== Early life ==
Paul Dalio was born on December 8, 1979, and grew up in Wilton, Connecticut. He is the son of hedge fund billionaire Ray Dalio. His grandfather, Marino Dallolio, was a New York jazz musician, who played the clarinet and saxophone.

He was educated at St. Luke's School in New Canaan, Connecticut. In 2004, Dalio received a bachelor's degree from the NYU Tisch School of the Arts dramatic writing program.

== Background ==
After graduating in 2004 he went to Los Angeles to work for a film producer, when he had a psychotic episode, was hospitalized and diagnosed bipolar. He spent two years in and out of hospitals, stopped screenwriting and got into the New York underground rap battle scene under the alias “Luna.” He applied to the graduate filmmaking program and was admitted in 2006, but during orientation week suffered another psychotic episode, had to be hospitalized and withdrew from the program. During his depression he got a job in construction and reapplied to NYU in 2007 where he met his wife and collaborator Kristina Nikolova. There he also met his professor Spike Lee who became a mentor and offered to executive produce a rap musical he had written while in the bipolar swings about the Apocalypse. During their work his wife suggested he write another script which came from the perspective of having overcome his struggle with bipolar so that it may offer others a path out.

Taking his wife's advice, he wrote the script and showed it to Spike who executive produced the film which would be his feature debut, originally titled Mania Days, starring Katie Holmes and Luke Kirby - a love story between two bipolar poets who bring out all the horror and beauty of their condition, until they have to choose between sanity and love. Dalio began studying music in 2013 and after developing a passion for it, decided to score the film, composing and producing all the music himself. His wife shot and produced the film and gave birth to their child on the last day of shooting. Paul and his wife started their production company, Moonstruck, as a banner for films which both will write and direct.

== Touched With Fire ==
Touched With Fire was a New York Times Critics' Pick and was well received with a 67% critic's approval rating at Rotten Tomatoes. and was also embraced by the bipolar community, receiving the SAMHSA Voice Award and the International Bipolar Foundation Imagine Award. In 2017, he received the Erasing the Stigma Leadership Award from Didi Hirsch Mental Health Services, and the Shining Star Award from the Ryan Licht Sang Foundation. Dalio was listed as a "composer to watch" in Film Music Magazine's Best Scores of 2016.

== Personal life ==
Dalio is married to Bulgarian-born fellow film director, Kristina Nikolova, and they live in New York with their two children. His older brother Devon (1978–2020) was killed in an automobile accident on December 17, 2020.
