= Rainer M. Holm-Hadulla =

German professor (born 1951)

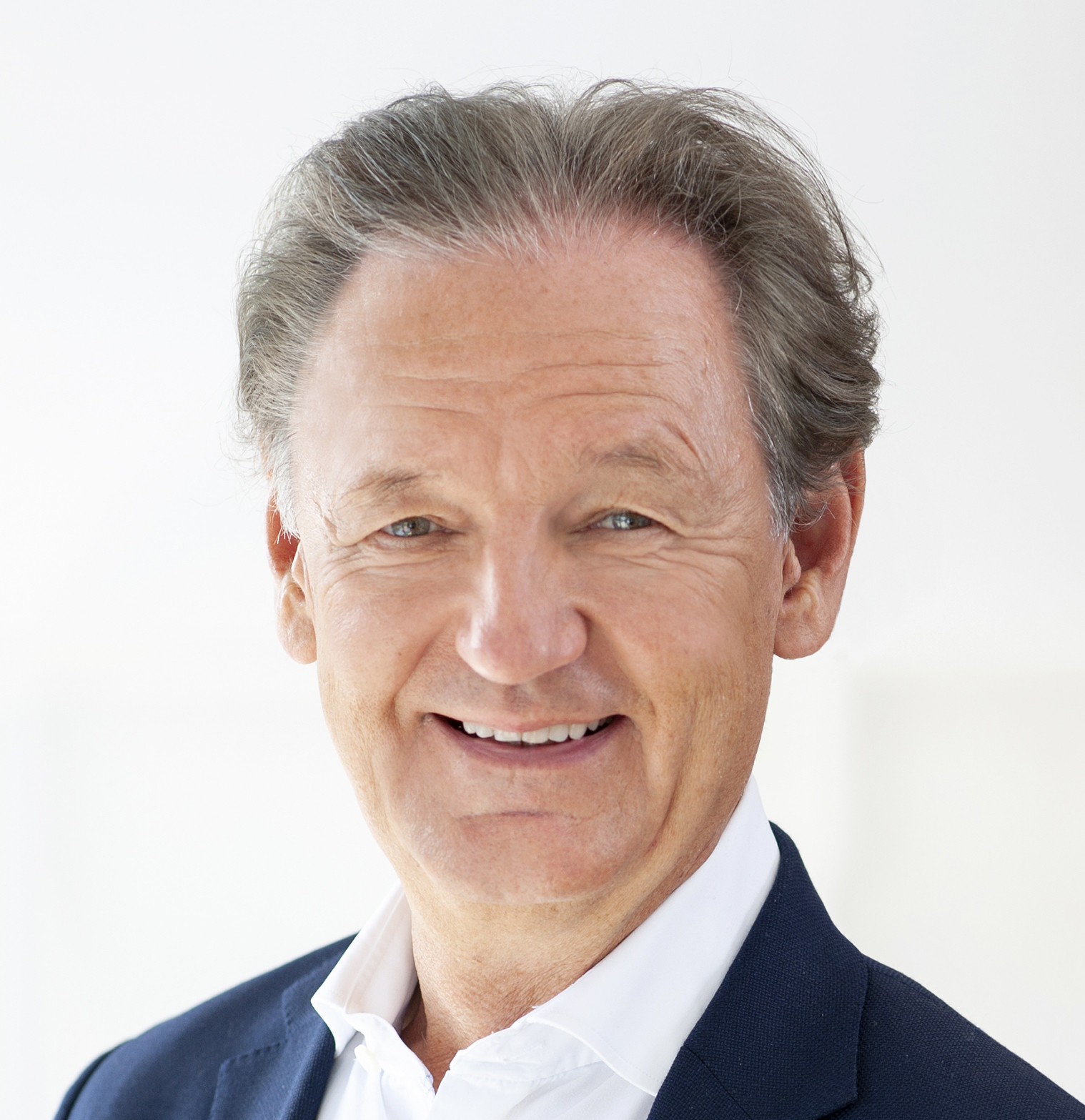
Rainer M. Holm-Hadulla

Rainer Matthias Holm-Hadulla (born September 22, 1951) is a German professor for psychiatry, psychosomatic medicine and psychotherapy.

== Life ==
Holm-Hadulla studied medicine and philosophy at the Universities of Marburg, Rome, and Heidelberg. During the period from 1976 until 1978, he worked as an assistant doctor. Since 1979 until 1986, he became a specialist in psychiatry, psychosomatic medicine and psychotherapy and an assistant professor at Heidelberg University.

From 1986 until 2016, he was the director of the counseling service for students at Heidelberg University and worked as a psychiatrist, psychotherapist and psychoanalyst in private practice. In 1996, he became an associate professor for psychotherapy and psychotherapeutic medicine at Heidelberg University. In 2009, Holm-Hadulla was appointed as a distinguished fellow to "Morphomata", International Center of Excellence for Advanced Studies at Cologne University. In 2010, he was appointed as a distinguished fellow to "Marsilius-Kolleg", Center of Excellence for Advanced Interdisciplinary Studies at Heidelberg University. In 2011, he became a visiting professor at the Universidad Diego Portales, Santiago de Chile. In 2015, he was appointed to the Academia Argentina de Ciencias, Psychoanálisis y Psiqiuatría. Moreover, Holm-Hadulla frequently gave scientific lectures in North-America, South-America and China.

Since 2017, Holm-Hadulla continues to research and teach as an emeritus at Heidelberg University and as a guest professor at Universidad de Chile. He also teaches as a visiting professor at national and international universities, e.g. the Pop-Academy Baden-Württemberg, Mannheim.

In 2024 Holm-Hadulla was appointed as Honorary Member of the Chilean Academy of Medicine. In 2025 he was awarded the degree of "Doctor Honoris Causa en Derechos Humanos para la Paz."

His main areas of research are counseling, psychotherapy and creativity. He continuously informes about practical applications of his research in broadcast and radio stations, newspapers and journals.

== Dialectical theory of creativity ==
Holm-Hadulla developed with his colleagues a dialectical theory of creativity. It starts with the antique concept, that creativity takes place in an interplay between order and chaos. Similar ideas can be found in neurosciences and psychology. Neurobiologically, it can be shown that the creative process takes place in a dynamic interplay between coherence and incoherence that leads to new and usable neuronal networks. Psychology shows how the dialectics of convergent and focused thinking with divergent and associative thinking leads to new ideas and products. Also creative personality traits seem to be contradictory, e.g. openness and selfishness, chaotic and disciplined attitudes, despondency and exuberance. Holm-Hadulla described the dialectics of creative personality traits on behalf of extraordinary personalities like Johann Wolfgang von Goethe, Robert Schumann, Jim Morrison, Madonna Ciccone and Mick Jagger. His dialectical theory of creativity applies also to counseling and psychotherapy.

== Selected publications ==
=== Books ===
- El Arte Psicoterapéutico - la hermenéutica como base de la acción terapéutica. Revised and expanded Spanish edition. Editorial Herder, Barcelona 1997, ISBN 84-254-2072-5
- The Art of Counseling and Psychotherapy. Revised and expanded English edition. Karnac Books, London/New York 2004, ISBN 1-85575-946-2
- Leidenschaft: Goethes Weg zur Kreativität. Eine Psychobiographie. Vandenhoeck & Ruprecht, Göttingen 2009, ISBN 978-3-525-40409-6
- Kreativität. Konzept und Lebensstil. Vandenhoeck & Ruprecht, Göttingen 2010, ISBN 3-525-49073-9
- Kreativität zwischen Schöpfung und Zerstörung. Konzepte aus Kulturwissenschaften, Psychologie, Neurobiologie und ihre praktischen Anwendungen. Vandenhoeck & Ruprecht, Göttingen 2011, ISBN 978-3-525-40433-1
- Passione. Il cammino di Goethe verso la creatività. Una psicobiografia. Traduzione dal tedesco e cura di Antonio Staude, edizione rielaborata e accresciuta rispetto all'opera originale. Mimesis Edizioni, Milano 2016, ISBN 978-88-5753-234-9* The Recovered Voice - Tales of Practical Psychotherapy. Karnac Books, London/New York 2017, ISBN 978-1-78220-398-8
- Goethe's Path to Creativity: A Psycho-Biography of the Eminent Politician, Scientist and Poet. Routledge, Taylor & Francis Group 2019, ISBN 978-1-138-62604-1
- Integrative Psychotherapie. 2. ed., Psychosozial-Verlag, Gießen 2021, ISBN 978-3-3879-7765-3
- Psicoterapia Integrativa - Un modello interdisciplinare attraverso tredici racconti di pratica psycoterapeutica. Mimesis Edizioni, Milano 2022, ISBN 9788857580920
- The Creative Transformation of Despair, Hate and Violence - What we can learn from Madonna, Mick Jagger & Co. Springer International, Switzerland 2023, ISBN 978-3-031-27384-1
- La transformación creativa de la desesperación, el odio y la violencia: de Mozar, Goethe y Picasso a Madonna, Mick Jagger y Taylor Swift, ISBN 978-956-415-214-1

=== Editor ===
- with Joachim Funke, Michael Wink: Intelligence - Theories and Applications, Springer Nature, London, Berlin, New York 2022, ISBN 978-3-031-04197-6.

=== Selected papers ===
- Holm-Hadulla, R. M. (2003). "Psychoanalysis as a creative shaping process". The International Journal of Psychoanalysis, 84, 1203–1220
- Holm-Hadulla, R. M. (2005). "Aesthetic and hermeneutic judgements in psychotherapy". Philosophy, Psychiatry, & Psychology, 12, 297–299
- Holm-Hadulla, R. M., Roussel, M., & Hofmann, F. (2010). "Depression and creativity: The case of the German poet, scientist and statesman J. W. v. Goethe". Journal of Affective Disorders, 127 (1–3), 43–49
- Holm-Hadulla, R. M. (2011). "Creatividad, Depresión y Psicoanálisis: el caso Goethe". Revista Argentina de Psicoanálisis, 58, 695–714
- Holm-Hadulla R. M., Sperth M., & Hofmann F. (2011). "Integrative Counselling". Asian-Pacific Journal of Counselling and Psychotherapy, 2, 3–24
- Holm-Hadulla, R. M. (2012). "Goethe's Anxieties, Depressive Episodes and (Self-) Therapeutic Strategies: A Contribution to Method Integration in Psychotherapy". Psychopathology, 46:266–274
- Holm-Hadulla, R. M. & Hofmann, F. (2012). "Counselling, psychotherapy and creativity". Asia Pacific Journal of Counselling And Psychotherapy, 3, 130–136
- Holm-Hadulla, R. M. (2013). "The Dialectic of Creativity: A Synthesis of Neurobiological, Psychological, Cultural and Practical Aspects of the Creative Process". Creativity Research Journal, 25(3), 293–299
- Holm-Hadulla, R. M., Bertolino, A. (2014). "Creativity, Alcohol and Drug Abuse: The Pop Icon Jim Morrison". Psychopathology, 47(3):167–173
- Holm-Hadulla, R. M., Koutsoukou-Argyraki, A. (2015). "Mental Health of Students in a Globalized World". Mental Health and Prevention, 3, 1–4
- Holm-Hadulla, R. M., Koutsoukou-Argyraki, A. (2016)."Integrative Psychotherapy of Patients with Schizophrenic Spectrum Disorders: The Case of a Musician Suffering From Psychotic Episodes". Journal of Psychotherapy Integration, 26(4):425-436
- Holm-Hadulla, R. M., Koutsoukou-Argyraki, A. (2017)."Bipolar Disorder and/or Creative Bipolarity: Robert Schumann's Exemplary Psychopathology". Psychopathology, 50(6):379-388
- Holm-Hadulla, R. M. (2019). "Sympathy for the Devil - The Creative Transformation of the Evil". Journal of Genius and Eminence, 5(1):1–11
- Holm-Hadulla, R. M., Wendt, AN (2020). Dialectical Thinking – Further Contributions to Creativity. In: Encylocpedia of Creativity, Runco, M. & Pritzker, S. (Eds.), Academic Press
- Holm-Hadulla, R. M. (2020). "Creativity and Positive Psychology in Psychotherapy." International Journal of Psychiatry, doi.org/10.1080/09540261
- Holm-Hadulla, R. M., Klimov, M., Juche, T., Möltner, A., Herpertz, SC. (2021). Well-Being and Mental Health of Students during the COVID-19 Pandemic. Psychopathology, doi10.1159/000519366
- Holm-Hadulla, R. M., Mayer, C.H., Wendler, H., Kotera, Y., Kremer T., Herpertz, SC. (2022). Fear, depression and well-being during the COVID-19 Pandemic in German and South African students: A cross-cultural comparison. Frontiers of Psychology, doi: 10.3389/psyg.2022.920125
- Holm-Hadulla R. M., Wendler H, Baracsi G, Storck T, Möltner A and Herpertz S (2023). Depression and social isolation during the COVID-19 pandemic in a student population: the effects of establishing and relaxing social restrictions. Frontiers in Psychiatry, doi: 10.3389/fpsyt.2023.1200643
- Holm-Hadulla, R.M., Kösler, L.-M., Bauer, S., Möltner, A. (2024). The relationship between sense of coherence and self-efficacy with well-being and mental health – the situation of students at a typical German university during the COVID-19 pandemic and 1 year after the lifting of social restrictions. Frontiers in Psychology, 15:1200643. doi: 10.3389/fpsyg.2024.1457992.
