= International Journal of Cross Cultural Management =

- Discipline: Management
- Language: English
- Edited by: Terence Jackson

Publication details
- History: 2001-present
- Publisher: SAGE Publications
- Frequency: Triannually
- Impact factor: (2013)

Standard abbreviations
- ISO 4: Int. J. Cross Cult. Manag.

Indexing
- ISSN: 1470-5958 (print); 1741-2838 (web)
- LCCN: 2002200042
- OCLC no.: 46954441

Links
- Journal homepage; Online access; Online archive

The International Journal of Cross Cultural Management is a triannual peer-reviewed academic journal that covers the field of cross-cultural management. The editor-in-chief is Terence Jackson (Middlesex University). The journal was established in 2001 and is published by SAGE Publications.

== Abstracting and indexing ==
The journal is abstracted and indexed in:

- Academics Premier
- British Education Index
- Current Contents/Social and Behavioral Sciences
- Current Index to Journals in Education
- Educational Research Abstracts Online
- Management & Marketing Abstracts Database
- Social Sciences Citation Index
- Scopus
