= Kay Redfield Jamison =

American bipolar disorder researcher

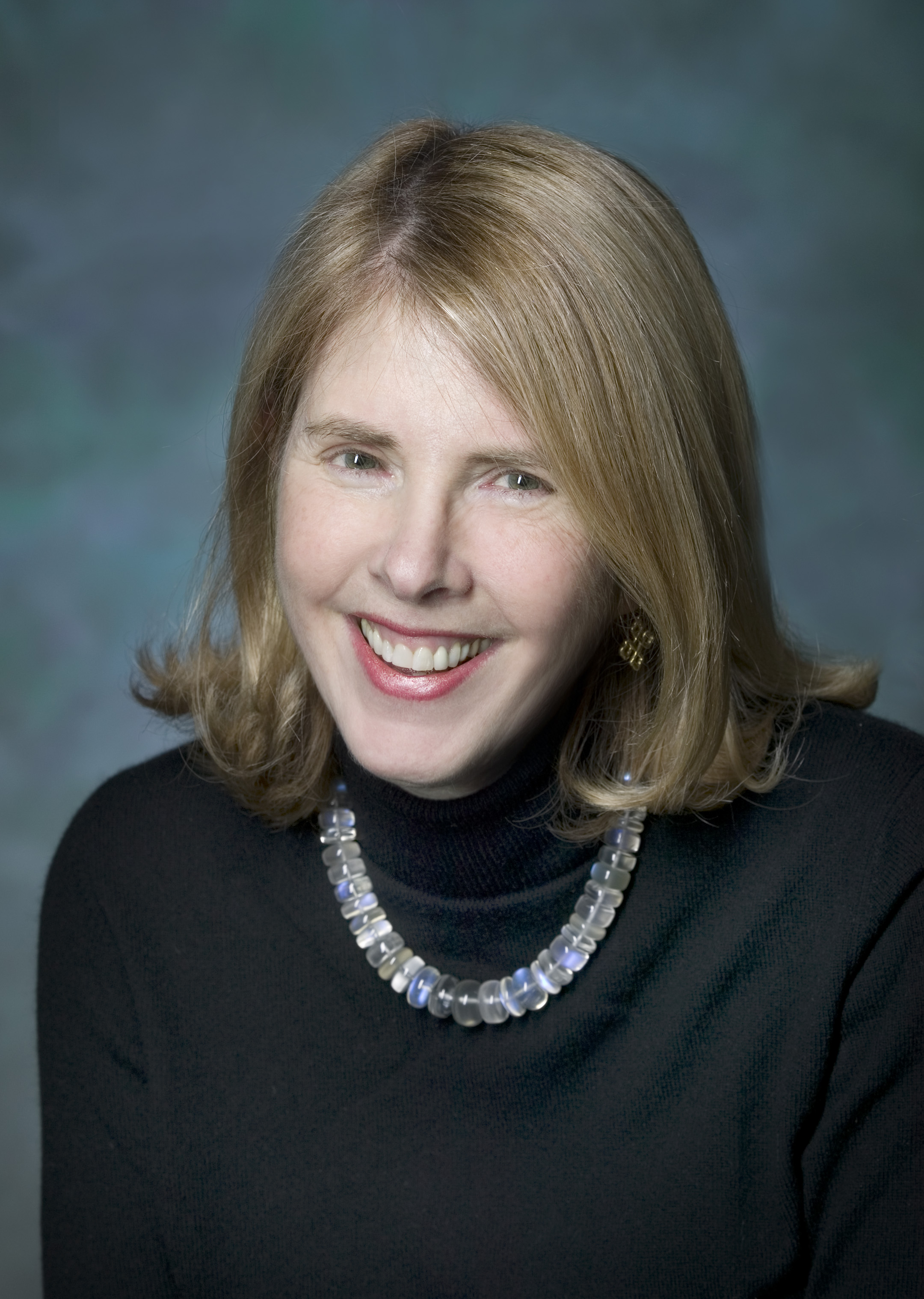
- Kay Redfield Jamison in 2007
- Born: June 22, 1946 (age 80)

Academic background
- Education: University of California, Los Angeles

Academic work
- Institutions: Johns Hopkins School of Medicine; University of St Andrews
- Main interests: Psychiatry
- Notable works: An Unquiet Mind; Manic-Depressive Illness

Kay Redfield Jamison (born June 22, 1946) is an American clinical psychologist and writer. Her work has centered on bipolar disorder, which she has had since her early adulthood. She holds the post of the Dalio Professor in Mood Disorders and Psychiatry at Johns Hopkins University School of Medicine and is an Honorary Professor of English at the University of St Andrews.

== Education and career ==
Jamison began her study of clinical psychology at University of California, Los Angeles in the late 1960s, receiving both B.A. and M.A. degrees in 1971. She continued on at UCLA, receiving a C.Phil. in 1973 and a PhD in 1975, and became a faculty member at the university. She went on to found and direct the school's Affective Disorders Clinic, a large teaching and research facility for outpatient treatment. She also studied zoology and neurophysiology as an undergraduate at the University of St. Andrews in Scotland.

After several years as a tenured professor at UCLA, Jamison was offered a position as Assistant Professor and then Professor of Psychiatry at the Johns Hopkins University School of Medicine. Jamison has given visiting lectures at a number of different institutions while maintaining her professorship at Hopkins. She was distinguished lecturer at Harvard University in 2002 and the Litchfield lecturer at the University of Oxford in 2003. She was Honorary President and board member of the Canadian Psychological Association from 2009 to 2010. In 2010, she was a panelist in the series of discussions on the latest research into the brain, hosted by Charlie Rose with series scientist Eric Kandel on PBS.

== Awards and recognition ==
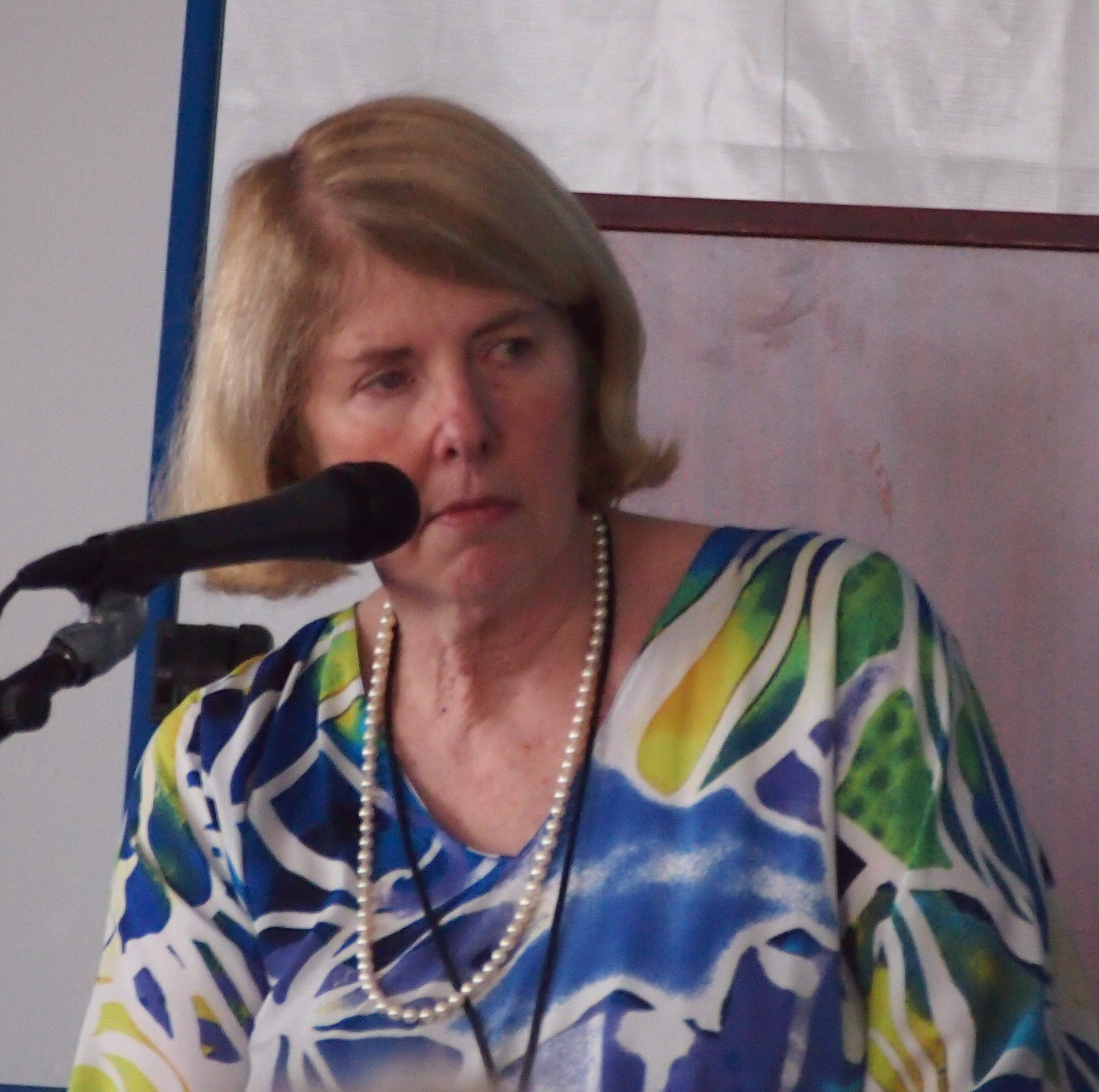
Jamison at a book fair in 2017

Jamison has won numerous awards and published over 100 academic articles. She has been named one of the "Best Doctors in the United States" and was chosen by Time as a "Hero of Medicine." She was also chosen as one of the five individuals for the public television series Great Minds of Medicine. Jamison is the recipient of the National Mental Health Association's William Styron Award (1995), the American Foundation for Suicide Prevention Research Award (1996), the Community Mental Health Leadership Award (1999), and was a 2001 MacArthur Fellowship recipient. In 2010, Jamison was conferred with an Honorary Degree of Doctor of Letters from the University of St Andrews in recognition of all her life's work. In May 2011, The General Theological Seminary of the Episcopal Church, New York, made her a Doctor of Divinity honoris causa at its annual Commencement. In 2017 Jamison was elected a Corresponding Fellow of the Royal Society of Edinburgh (CorrFRSE).

== Academic contributions ==
Her latest book, Robert Lowell: Setting the River on Fire, was a Pulitzer Prize Finalist for Biography in 2018.

Her book Manic-Depressive Illness, first published in 1990 and co-authored with psychiatrist Frederick K. Goodwin is considered a classic textbook on bipolar disorder. The Acknowledgements section states that Goodwin "received unrestricted educational grants to support the production of this book from Abbott, AstraZeneca, Bristol Meyers Squibb, Forest, GlaxoSmithKline, Janssen, Eli Lilly, Pfizer, and Sanofi", but that although Jamison has "received occasional lecture honoraria from AstraZeneca, GlaxoSmithKline, and Eli Lilly" she "has received no research support from any pharmaceutical or biotechnology company" and donates her royalties to a non-profit foundation.

Her seminal works among laypeople are her memoir An Unquiet Mind, which details her experience with severe mania and depression, and Night Falls Fast: Understanding Suicide, providing historical, religious, and cultural responses to suicide, as well as the relationship between mental illness and suicide. In Night Falls Fast, Jamison dedicates a chapter to American public policy and public opinion as it relates to suicide. Her second memoir, Nothing Was the Same, examines her relationship with her second husband, the psychiatrist Richard Jed Wyatt, who was Chief of the Neuropsychiatry Branch of the National Institute of Mental Health until his death in 2002.

In her study Exuberance: The Passion for Life, she cites research that suggests that 15 percent of people who could be diagnosed as bipolar may never actually become depressed; in effect, they are permanently "high" on life. She mentions President Theodore Roosevelt as an example.

Touched with Fire: Manic-Depressive Illness and the Artistic Temperament is Jamison's exploration of how bipolar disorder can run in artistic or high-achieving families. As an example, she cites Lord Byron and his relatives.

Jamison wrote An Unquiet Mind: A Memoir of Moods and Madness in part to help clinicians see what patients find helpful in therapy. J. Wesley Boyd, an assistant professor at the Department of Psychiatry at Tufts University's School of Medicine, wrote, "Jamison's description [of the debt she owed her psychiatrist] illustrates the importance of merely being present for our patients and not trying to soothe them with platitudes or promises of a better future."

== Personal life ==
Jamison has said she is an "exuberant" person who longs for peace and tranquility but in the end prefers "tumultuousness coupled to iron discipline" to a "stunningly boring life." In An Unquiet Mind, she concluded:

I long ago abandoned the notion of a life without storms, or a world without dry and killing seasons. Life is too complicated, too constantly changing, to be anything but what it is. And I am, by nature, too mercurial to be anything but deeply wary of the grave unnaturalness involved in any attempt to exert too much control over essentially uncontrollable forces. There will always be propelling, disturbing elements, and they will be there until, as Lowell put it, the watch is taken from the wrist. It is, at the end of the day, the individual moments of restlessness, of bleakness, of strong persuasions and maddened enthusiasms, that inform one's life, change the nature and direction of one's work, and give final meaning and color to one's loves and friendships.

Jamison was born to Dr. Marshall Verdine Jamison (1916–2012), an officer in the U.S. Air Force, and Mary Dell Temple Jamison (1916–2007). Jamison's father, and many others in his family, had bipolar disorder.

As a result of Jamison's military background, she grew up in many different places, including Florida, Puerto Rico, California, Tokyo, and Washington, D.C. She has two older siblings, a brother and a sister, who are three years and half a year older, respectively. Her niece is writer Leslie Jamison. Jamison's interest in science and medicine began at a young age and was fostered by her parents. She worked as a candy striper at the hospital on Andrews Air Force Base.

Jamison moved to California during adolescence, and soon thereafter began to struggle with bipolar disorder. She continued to struggle in college at UCLA. At first she wanted to become a doctor, but because of increasing occurring manic episodes, she decided she could not maintain the rigorous discipline needed for medical school. Jamison then found her calling in psychology. Here she flourished and was extremely interested in mood disorders. Despite her studies, Jamison did not realize that she was bipolar until three months into her first job as a professor in UCLA's Department of Psychology. After her diagnosis, she was put on lithium, a drug that has commonly been used to regulate and moderate moods. At times, she would refuse the medication because it impaired her motor skills, but after a greater depression she decided to continue to take it. Jamison once attempted suicide by overdosing on lithium during a severe depressive episode.

Jamison is an Episcopalian, and she was married to her first husband, Alain André Moreau, an artist, during her graduate school years. She later married Dr. Richard Wyatt in 1994; and they remained married until his death in 2002. Wyatt was a psychiatrist who studied schizophrenia at the National Institutes of Health. Their romance is detailed in her memoir Nothing Was the Same.

In 2010, Jamison married Thomas Traill, a cardiology professor at Johns Hopkins.

== Bibliography ==
Kay Redfield Jamison talks about Nothing Was the Same on Bookbits radio.

- Goodwin, Frederick K.; Jamison, Kay Redfield (1990), Manic-Depressive Illness, New York: Oxford University Press, ISBN 0-19-503934-3

- Goodwin, Frederick K.; Jamison, Kay Redfield (2007), Manic-Depressive Illness (Second ed.), New York: Oxford University Press, ISBN 978-0195135794

- Jamison, Kay Redfield (1993), Touched with Fire: Manic-Depressive Illness and the Artistic Temperament, New York: The Free Press, ISBN 0-02-916030-8 (includes a study of Lord Byron's illness)
- Jamison, Kay Redfield (1995), An Unquiet Mind, New York: Vintage Books Random House, ISBN 0-679-76330-9
- Jamison, Kay Redfield (1999), Night Falls Fast: Understanding Suicide, New York: Vintage Books Random House, ISBN 0-375-70147-8
- Jamison, Kay Redfield (2004), Exuberance: The Passion for Life, New York: Alfred A. Knopf, ISBN 0-375-40144-X
- Jamison, Kay Redfield (2009), Nothing Was the Same: A Memoir, New York: Alfred A. Knopf, ISBN 978-0-307-26537-1
- Jamison, Kay Redfield (2017), Robert Lowell: Setting the River on Fire, New York: Alfred A. Knopf, ISBN 978-0307700278
- Jamison, Kay Redfield (2023). Fires in the Dark: Healing the Mind, the Oldest Branch of Medicine. Knopf. ISBN 978-0-525-65717-0.
- Flora McDonnell, ed., Threads of Hope: Learning to Live with Depression (Short Books, 2003, ISBN 978-1-904095-35-4), with contributions by Kay Redfield Jamison, Margaret Drabble, Wendy Cope, Andrew Solomon, Virginia Ironside, Lewis Wolpert, and Alastair Campbell
