= Comparison of open-source operating systems =

These tables compare free software / open-source operating systems. Where not all of the versions support a feature, the first version which supports it is listed.

== General information ==
| Name | License | Kernel type | Kernel programming language | Kernel thread support | OS family | Oldest non-EOL version (Note: No for single line development model.) | Forks |
|---|---|---|---|---|---|---|---|
| AROS | APL | Exokernel | C | | AmigaOS | No | |
| Darwin, OpenDarwin | APSL | Hybrid | C, C++ (Note: For I/O Kit.) | 1:1 | BSD, Unix, Unix-like, OS X | No | PureDarwin |
| DragonFly BSD | BSD | Hybrid | C | 1:1 | BSD, Unix-like | No | |
| eCos | modified GPL, eCos | RTOS | C, C++ | | RTOS | No | |
| E/OS | GPLv2 | Monolithic | ASM, C | 1:1 | BeOS, Unix-like | No | |
| FreeBSD | BSD; GPL, LGPL software usually included | Monolithic with modules | C | 1:1 | BSD, Unix-like | 13.5 | DragonFly BSD |
| FreeDOS | GPL | Monolithic | C | | DOS | 1.1 | |
| FreeRTOS | MIT | RTOS | C | | RTOS | No | |
| Genode | AGPL | Microkernel | C++ | 1:1 | Genode | | |
| GNU | GPL | Multiserver Microkernel (Hurd kernel) or Monolithic (Linux-libre kernel, fork of Linux kernel, and other kernels which are not part of the GNU Project) | C | 1:1 | Unix-like | 2.4 on Linux-libre kernel (not on Hurd kernel) | Linux |
| Haiku | MIT | Hybrid | C, C++ | | BeOS | No | TiltOS |
| OpenHarmony | Apache | Multi-kernel (inc. add-ons, alongside custom add-ons not part of OpenHarmony project) | Various (C, C++, Rust, Cangjie) | 1:1, M:N, POSIX | HarmonyOS (without AOSP), LiteOS | 3.0.1 LTS | Oniro OS, HarmonyOS (NEXT) |
| HelenOS | BSD | Microkernel | C | M:N | own/original | No | |
| House | BSD | | Haskell | | own/original | No | |
| Inferno | GPL, LGPL; MIT | | C | | Plan 9 | No | OzInferno |
| KolibriOS | GPL | Monolithic | ASM | | MenuetOS | No | |
| L4, Fiasco, Pistachio | Some GPL, some BSD | Microkernel | C++ | | L4 | No | |
| Linux | GPL version 2 only | Monolithic with modules | C | 1:1 | Unix-like | 4.4 | elks |
| MenuetOS | Menuet 64, commerce excluded, GPL v2(Menuet 32) | Monolithic | ASM | | own/original | No | KolibriOS |
| MINIX | BSD | Microkernel | C | | Unix-like | No | |
| NetBSD | BSD | Monolithic with modules | C | 1:1 | BSD, Unix-like | 7.0 | OpenBSD |
| NuttX | BSD | RTOS | C | | RTOS | No | |
| Oniro | Eclipse, Apache | Multi-kernel (inc. add-ons, alongside custom add-ons not part of Oniro project) | Various (C, C++, Rust, Cangjie) | 1:1, M:N, POSIX | OpenHarmony | 3.2 LTS | |
| OpenBSD | BSD | Monolithic | C | 1:1 | BSD, Unix-like | 6.4Dragon | MirOS |
| OpenSolaris | CDDL | Monolithic with modules | C | 1:1, M:N | Unix | No | illumos |
| osFree | BSD, GPL, LGPL | Microkernel | C, C++, Assembly, Makefile, IGOR Pro | | OS/2-like | No | |
| Plan 9 | MIT | Hybrid | C | 1:1, 1:M Cothread style. | own, Unix informed | No | Inferno, Plan B, 9front |
| ReactOS | GPL, LGPL | Hybrid | C, C++ | | Windows-like | No | |
| RedoxOS | MIT | Microkernel | Rust | | Unix-like | No | |
| RISC OS | Apache 2.0 | Monolithic (with cooperative multitasking) | ARM assembly, C, BBC BASIC | No | RISC OS | No | RISC OS 6 |
| RTEMS | modified GPL, BSD, Stanford | RTOS | C and ASM with native support for other languages including C++ and Ada | POSIX, RTEID/ORKID, uITRON | RTOS | 4.7.1 | |
| Syllable | GPL | Hybrid | C, C++ | 1:1 | Unix-like, BeOS, AmigaOS, POSIX | No | |
| TempleOS | public domain | Monolithic | HolyC, C, C++ | | Commodore 64-like | No | |
| Name | License | Kernel type | Kernel programming language | Kernel thread support | OS family | Oldest non-EOL version | Forks |

== Supported architectures ==
| Name | x86, i386, IA-32 | x86 SMP | Xen | IA-64 | x86-64 | PowerPC | PowerPC SMP | SPARC32 | SPARC SMP | Alpha | MIPS | ARM | XScale | M68k | PA-RISC | OpenRISC | Elbrus | LoongArch | SuperH | z/Architecture | others | hosted mode |
|---|---|---|---|---|---|---|---|---|---|---|---|---|---|---|---|---|---|---|---|---|---|---|
| Linux | Yes | Yes | Yes | Yes | Yes | Yes | Yes | Yes | Yes | Yes | Yes | Yes | Yes | Yes | Yes | Yes | Yes | Yes | No | Yes | FR-V, Cell, ETRAX CRIS, M32R, Xtensa, h8, s390, SuperH | UML, coLinux, MkLinux, Itanium Linux-on-Linux, wombat |
| FreeBSD | Yes | Yes | Yes | Yes | Yes | Yes | Yes | No | Yes | No | Yes | Yes | Yes | No | No | No | No | Yes | No | No | PC98 | |
| OpenBSD | Yes | Yes | No | No | Yes | Yes | Yes | No | Yes | Yes | Yes | Yes | Yes | No | Yes | No | No | No | Yes | No | | |
| NetBSD | Yes | Yes | Yes | Yes | Yes | Yes | Yes | Yes | Yes | Yes | Yes | Yes | Yes | Yes | Yes | Yes | No | No | Yes | No | ns32k, VAX, hppa, M68010, mipseb, mipsel, sh3eb, sh3el, sparc64 | |
| DragonFly BSD | No | No | No | No | Yes | No | No | No | No | No | No | No | No | No | No | No | No | No | No | No | | vkernel |
| OpenSolaris illumos | Yes | Yes | Yes | No | Yes | No | No | Yes | Yes | No | No | No | No | No | No | No | No | No | No | Yes | | |
| Darwin, OpenDarwin | Yes | Yes | No | No | Yes | Yes | Yes | No | No | No | No | Yes | No | Yes | No | No | No | No | No | No | | L4/Darwin |
| OpenHarmony | Yes | Yes | No | Yes | Yes | No | No | Yes | Yes | No | Yes | Yes | No | No | No | No | No | Yes | No | No | | |
| Oniro | No | Yes | No | No | Yes | No | No | No | No | No | No | Yes | No | No | No | No | No | Yes | No | No | | |
| MINIX | Yes | No | No | No | No | No | No | No | No | No | No | Yes | No | No | No | No | No | No | No | No | | |
| FreeDOS | Yes | No | No | No | No | No | No | No | No | No | No | No | No | No | No | No | No | No | No | No | | |
| Genode | Yes | Yes | Yes | No | Yes | No | No | No | No | No | No | Yes | No | No | No | No | No | No | No | No | RISC-V | Linux |
| Haiku | Yes | Yes | No | No | Yes | No | No | No | No | No | No | Yes | No | No | No | No | No | No | No | No | RISC-V | |
| KolibriOS | Yes | No | No | No | No | No | No | No | No | No | No | No | No | No | No | No | No | No | No | No | | |
| MenuetOS | Yes | No | No | No | Yes | No | No | No | No | No | No | No | No | No | No | No | No | No | No | No | | |
| GNU | Yes | Yes | Yes | Yes (Note: with Linux-libre kernel and others, but not on Hurd kernel) | Yes | Yes | Yes | Yes | Yes | Yes | Yes | Yes | Yes | Yes | Yes | Yes | Yes | Yes | Yes | Yes | FR-V, Cell, ETRAX CRIS, M32R, Xtensa, h8, s390, SuperH | UML, Itanium Linux-on-Linux (Note: with Linux-libre and Linux kernel) |
| ReactOS | Yes | Yes | No (Note: work in progress) | No | Yes | No | No | No | No | No | No | Yes | No | No | No | No | No | No | No | No | | |
| RISC OS | No | No | No | No | No | No | No | No | No | No | No | Yes | No | No | No | No | No | No | No | No | | Genode |
| L4, Pistachio | Yes | No | No | Yes (Note: Pistachio supports AMD64; Fiasco only in the CVS version.) | Yes | Yes | No | No | No | Yes | Yes | Yes | No | No | No | No | No | No | No | No | | Genode |
| Plan 9 | Yes | Yes | Yes | No | Yes | Yes | Yes | Yes (Note: Support is outdated or unmaintained.) | Yes | Yes | Yes | Yes | Yes | Yes | No | No | No | No | No | No | See | lguest, vx32 |
| AROS | Yes | No | No | No | Yes | Yes | No | No | No | No | No | Yes | No | Yes | No | No | No | No | No | No | | i386-linux, i386-freebsd |
| Syllable | Yes | Yes | No | No | No | No | No | No | No | No | No | No | No | No | No | No | No | No | No | No | | |
| Inferno | Yes | ? | No | No | ? | Yes | ? | Yes | ? | No | Yes | Yes | Yes | Yes | No | No | No | No | No | No | AMD Am29000, Texas Instruments OMAP | Microsoft Windows, Linux, FreeBSD, Plan 9, OS X, Solaris, Irix, UnixWare, HP-UX, Internet Explorer |
| FreeRTOS | Yes | No | No | No | No | No | No | No | No | No | Yes | Yes | No | No | No | Yes | No | No | Yes | No | AVR, PIC, MSP430, HCS12, 8052, MicroBlaze, Cortex-M3, H8S | |
| eCos | Yes | Yes | No | No | No | Yes | No | Yes | No | No | Yes | Yes | Yes | Yes | No | Yes | No | No | Yes | No | CalmRISC, ColdFire, FR-V, h8, Matsushita AM3x, Nios II, NEC V8xx | Microsoft Windows, Linux |
| RTEMS | Yes | No | Xen | No | No | Yes | No | Yes | No | No | Yes | Yes | Yes | Yes | Yes | Yes | No | No | Yes | No | Blackfin, Nios II, Coldfire, Texas Instruments C3x/C4x, H8S | Linux, Solaris, Cygwin, FreeBSD, multiple CPU simulators |
| HelenOS | Yes | Yes | No | Yes | Yes | Yes | No | Yes | Yes | No | Yes | Yes | No | No | No | No | No | No | Yes | No | | |
| E/OS | Yes | No | No | No | No | No | No | No | No | No | No | Yes | No | No | No | No | No | No | No | No | | |
| TempleOS | No | No | No | No | Yes | No | No | No | No | No | No | No | No | No | No | No | No | No | No | No | | QEMU, VirtualBox, etc. |
| Name | x86, i386, IA-32 | x86 SMP | Xen | IA-64 | x86-64 | PowerPC | PowerPC SMP | SPARC32 | SPARC SMP | Alpha | MIPS | ARM | XScale | M68k | PA-RISC | OpenRISC | Elbrus | LoongArch | SuperH | z/Architecture | other | hosted mode |

== Supported hardware ==
=== General ===
| Name | ATA | SATA | SCSI | USB 3.0 | USB 2.0 | USB 1.1 | FireWire | PCMCIA/PC card | AGP | Nvidia official driver IA-32 | Nvidia official driver IA-64 | Nvidia official driver AMD64 | ATI official driver x86 | ATI official driver x86-64 | ATI r200 free software driver | ATI r300 free software driver | Nvidia free software driver | Audio | TV tuner, video editing, or webcam |
|---|---|---|---|---|---|---|---|---|---|---|---|---|---|---|---|---|---|---|---|
| Linux | Yes | Yes | Yes | Yes 2.6.31+ | Yes | Yes | Yes | Yes | Yes | Yes | Yes | Yes | Yes | Yes | Yes | Yes | Yes, nv(2d only), nouveau(3d with mesa) | OSS, ALSA | V4L, V4L2 |
| FreeBSD | Yes | Yes | Yes | Yes 8.2+ | Yes | Yes | Yes | Yes | Yes | Yes | Yes | Yes | No | No | Yes | Yes | Yes | Yes | Yes |
| OpenBSD | Yes | Yes | Yes | Yes 5.7+ | Yes | Yes | No | Yes | Yes | No | No | No | No | No | Yes | 2d only | 2d only | Yes | Yes |
| NetBSD | Yes | Yes | Yes | Yes 8.0+ | Yes | Yes | Yes | Yes | Yes | No | No | No | No | No | | | | Yes | Yes |
| DragonFly BSD | Yes | Yes | Yes | Yes | Yes | Yes | Yes | Yes | Yes | No | No | No | No | No | | | | Yes | |
| OpenSolaris, illumos | Yes | Yes | Yes | No | Yes | Yes | Yes | Yes | Yes | Yes | No | Yes | No | No | | | | Yes | V4L2 |
| Darwin, OpenDarwin | Yes | Yes | Yes | Yes | | Yes | | | | No | No | No | No | No | | | | | |
| OpenHarmony | Yes | Yes | Yes | Yes | Yes | Yes | No | Yes | Yes | No | No | No | No | No | No | No | No | Yes | Yes |
| Oniro | Yes | Yes | Yes | Yes | Yes | Yes | No | Yes | Yes | No | No | No | No | No | No | No | No | Yes | Yes |
| MINIX | | | | | | | | | | No | No | No | No | No | | | | | |
| FreeDOS | Yes | Yes | Yes | No | No | No | No | | Yes | No | No | No | No | No | No | No | No | Yes | No |
| Genode | Yes | Yes | No | Yes | Yes | Yes | No | No | No | No | No | No | No | No | No | No | No | Yes | No |
| Haiku | Yes | Yes | Yes | | Yes | Yes | Yes | No | Yes | No | No | No | No | No | Yes | Yes | Yes | Yes | Yes |
| KolibriOS | Yes | Yes | No | | Yes | Yes | | No | No | No | No | No | No | No | | | | Yes | No |
| MenuetOS | Yes | No | No | | Yes | Yes | | No | No | No | No | No | No | No | | | | Yes | Yes |
| GNU | Yes | Yes (Note: is not supported on Hurd kernel for now) | Yes | | Yes | Yes | Yes | Yes | Yes | No (Note: Proprietary Software is not officially supported on GNU system) | No | No | No | No | No (Note: Proprietary Firmware blob is not officially supported on GNU system) | No | Yes | Yes | Yes |
| ReactOS | Yes | Yes | Yes | | Yes | Yes | No | No | Yes | No | No | No | No | No | | | | Yes | |
| RISC OS | ? | Yes | Yes | ? | Yes | Yes | No | No | No | No | No | No | No | No | No | No | No | Yes | TV tuner |
| L4, Fiasco, Pistachio | | | | | | | | | | No | No | No | No | No | | | | | |
| Plan 9 | Yes | Yes | Yes | | Yes | Yes | | Yes | Yes | No | No | No | No | No | | | | Yes | Yes |
| AROS | Yes | | | | | | | | Yes | No | No | No | own | No | | | 2D only | | |
| Syllable | Yes | Yes | | | Yes | Yes | | | Yes | No | No | No | No | No | | | | Yes | |
| Inferno | Yes | No | Yes | | No | No | No | Yes | Yes | No | No | No | No | No | | | | Yes | |
| FreeRTOS | | | | | | | | | | No | No | No | No | No | | | | | |
| eCos | Yes | Yes | | | Yes | Yes | | | | No | No | No | No | No | | | | | |
| RTEMS | Yes | | | | | | | Yes | | No | No | No | No | No | | | | | |
| HelenOS | Yes | Yes | No | | No | Yes | No | No | No | No | No | No | No | No | No | No | No | Yes | No |
| E/OS | Yes | Yes | Yes | | No | Yes | Yes | Yes | No | No | No | No | No | No | | | | Yes | Yes |
| Name | ATA | SATA | SCSI | USB 3.0 | USB 2.0 | USB 1.1 | FireWire | PCMCIA/PC card | AGP | Nvidia official driver IA-32 | Nvidia official driver IA-64 | Nvidia official driver AMD64 | ATI official driver x86 | ATI official driver x86-64 | ATI r200 free software driver | ATI r300 free software driver | Nvidia free software driver | Audio | TV tuner, video editing, or webcam |

=== Networking ===
| Name | Networking support | NE2000/RTL8029 | RTL8139 | Gigabit Ethernet | 10 Gigabit Ethernet | Wireless LAN | Bluetooth | IrDA |
|---|---|---|---|---|---|---|---|---|
| Linux | Yes | Yes | Yes | Yes | Yes | Yes | Yes | Yes |
| FreeBSD | Yes | Yes | Yes | Yes | Yes | Yes | Yes | Yes |
| OpenBSD | Yes | Yes | Yes | Yes | Yes | Yes | Yes | No |
| NetBSD | Yes | Yes | Yes | Yes | Yes | Yes | Yes | Yes |
| DragonFly BSD | Yes | | Yes | Yes | Yes | Yes | Yes | |
| OpenSolaris, illumos | Yes | | Yes | Yes | Yes | Yes | No | No |
| Darwin, OpenDarwin | Yes | | | | | | | |
| OpenHarmony | Yes | Yes | Yes | Yes | Yes | Yes | Yes | No |
| Oniro | Yes | Yes | Yes | Yes | Yes | Yes | Yes | No |
| MINIX | Yes | | Yes | | | | | |
| FreeDOS | Yes | Yes | Yes | | | | | |
| Genode | Yes | No | No | Yes | No | Yes | No | No |
| Haiku | Yes | Yes | Yes | Yes | | Yes | | |
| KolibriOS | Yes | Yes | Yes | | | | No | Yes |
| MenuetOS | Yes | Yes | | | | | No | No |
| GNU | Yes | | | | | | | |
| ReactOS | Yes | Yes | Yes | Yes | Yes | Yes | No | No |
| L4, Fiasco, Pistachio | | | | | | | | |
| Plan 9 | Yes | Yes | Yes | Yes | Yes | Yes | No | No |
| AROS | Yes | Yes | | | | | | |
| Syllable | Yes | Yes | Yes | Yes | | | | |
| Inferno | Yes | Yes | Yes | Yes | | Yes | No | No |
| FreeRTOS | | | | | | | | |
| eCos | Yes | | | Yes | | | Yes | |
| RTEMS | Yes | Yes | Yes | Yes | No | No | No | No |
| HelenOS | Yes | Yes | Yes | Yes | No | No | No | No |
| E/OS | Yes | Yes | Yes | Yes | Yes | No | No | No |
| Name | Networking support | NE2000/RTL8029 | RTL8139 | Gigabit Ethernet | 10 Gigabit Ethernet | Wireless LAN | Bluetooth | IrDA |

== Network technologies ==
| Name | Firewall | TCP/IP | IPv6 | IPX | PPP | PPPoE | DHCP | Bridge | TUN/TAP | SSH | OpenVPN |
|---|---|---|---|---|---|---|---|---|---|---|---|
| Linux | netfilter iptables/nftables | Yes | Yes | Yes | Yes | Yes | Yes | Yes | Yes | Yes | Yes |
| FreeBSD | IPFW2, IPFilter, PF | Yes | Yes | Yes | Yes | Yes | Yes | Yes | Yes | Yes | Yes |
| OpenBSD | PF | Yes | Yes | No | Yes | Yes | Yes | Yes | Yes | Yes | Yes |
| NetBSD | IPFilter, NPF, PF | Yes | Yes | | Yes | Yes (Note: NetBSD has a kernel-only PPPoE driver.) | Yes | Yes | Yes | Yes | Yes |
| DragonFly BSD | IPFW2, PF | Yes | Yes | No | Yes | Yes | Yes | Yes | Yes | Yes | |
| OpenSolaris, illumos | IPFilter | Yes | Yes | | Yes | Yes | Yes | Yes | Yes (Note: OpenSolaris has support for a TUN driver with TAP support) | Yes | Yes |
| Darwin, OpenDarwin | IPFW | Yes | Yes | | | | Yes | | | Yes | |
| OpenHarmony | | Yes | Yes | No | Yes | No | Yes | No | No | No | No |
| Oniro | | Yes | Yes | No | Yes | No | Yes | No | No | No | No |
| MINIX | | Yes | | | | | | | | Yes | |
| FreeDOS | | Yes | | Yes | Yes | Yes | Yes | | | Yes | |
| Genode | software IP routing | Yes | | No | No | No | Yes | Yes | | | |
| Haiku | None | Yes | Yes | | | | Yes | | | Yes | Yes |
| KolibriOS | None | Yes | | No | Yes | No | Yes | | | | |
| MenuetOS | None | Yes | | No | No | No | | | | | |
| GNU | netfilter iptables/nftables (with Linux-libre and Linux kernel) (Note: firewall is not supported on Hurd kernel for now) | Yes | Yes (Note: ipv6 is not supported on Hurd kernel for now) | | | | Yes (Note: dhcp is partially supported on Hurd kernel for now) | | | Yes | |
| ReactOS | | Yes | Yes | | | | | | | | |
| L4, Fiasco, Pistachio | | | | | | | | | | | |
| Plan 9 | ipmux | Yes | Yes | No | Yes | Yes | Yes | Yes | No | Yes | No |
| AROS | | Yes | | | | | | | | | |
| Syllable | | Yes | | | Yes | Yes | Yes | | | Yes | |
| Inferno | ipmux | Yes | Yes | No | Yes | Yes | Yes | Yes | No | No | No |
| FreeRTOS | | | | | | | | | | | |
| eCos | | Yes | Yes | | Yes | | Yes | | | Yes | |
| RTEMS | | Yes | No | | Yes | Yes | Yes | Yes | Yes | | |
| HelenOS | | Yes | Yes | No | No | No | Yes | No | No | No | No |
| E/OS | | Yes | Yes | Yes | Yes | Yes | Yes | Yes | Yes | Yes | No |
| Name | Firewall | TCP/IP | IPv6 | IPX | PPP | PPPoE | DHCP | bridge | TUN/TAP | ssh | OpenVPN |

== Supported file systems ==
| Name | Bcachefs | BFS | FAT16, dosfs; FAT32, vfat | NTFS | Ext2 | Ext3 | XFS | ReiserFS | UFS | UFS2 | HFS | HFS+ | MINIXfs | ISO 9660 | UDF | NFS | SMBFS | RAM disk, tmpfs | ZFS | Other special file systems |
|---|---|---|---|---|---|---|---|---|---|---|---|---|---|---|---|---|---|---|---|---|
| Linux | Yes | Yes (Note: Read only kernel driver.) | Yes | Yes (Note: From 5.15 there is a new NTFS in-kernel driver that's supports reads and writes) | Yes | Yes | Yes | Yes | Yes | Yes | Yes | Yes (Note: read/write access without journaling; HFS+ with journal either be opened read-only or be written with journal ignored (potentially corrupting the file system).) | Yes | Yes | Yes | Yes | Yes | Yes | Yes | 9P, (Note: 2.6 and later.); FUSE, sysfs, configfs, Reiser4, (Note: With patch Archived 15 April 2012 at the Wayback Machine.); JFS, Btrfs, UnionFS, Ext4 |
| FreeBSD | No | No | Yes | Yes (Note: Read/Write support via NTFS-3G.) | Yes | Yes | Yes (Note: Experimental.) | Yes | Yes | Yes | No | No | No | Yes | Yes | Yes | Yes | Yes | Yes | FUSE, nullfs, UnionFS |
| NetBSD | No | No | Yes | Yes | Yes | | No | No | Yes | Yes | | Yes | No | Yes | Yes | Yes | Yes | Yes | Yes | PUFFS, LFS, EFS |
| OpenBSD | No | No | Yes | Yes | Yes | | No | No | Yes | Yes | No | No | No | Yes | Yes | Yes | Yes | Yes | No | AFS |
| DragonFly BSD | No | No | Yes | Yes | Yes | No | No | No | Yes | No | No | No | No | Yes | Yes (Note: Read only.) | Yes | Yes | Yes | No | HAMMER, nullfs, PUFFS |
| OpenSolaris, illumos | No | No | Yes | Yes (Note: OpenSolaris also has an in-kernel, native SMB server built directly on the ZFS DMU.) | No | No | No | No | Yes | | No | No | No | Yes | Yes | Yes | Yes | Yes | Yes | SMB (native), QFS |
| Darwin, OpenDarwin | No | | Yes | Yes | | | | | Yes | | Yes | Yes | | Yes | Yes | Yes | Yes | | | |
| OpenHarmony | No | Yes | Yes | Yes | Yes | Yes | Yes | No | Yes | Yes | Yes | Yes | No | Yes | Yes | Yes | Yes | Yes | Yes | Ex4, F2FS, EROFS, HMDFS |
| Oniro | No | Yes | Yes | Yes | Yes | Yes | Yes | No | Yes | Yes | Yes | Yes | No | Yes | Yes | Yes | Yes | Yes | Yes | Ex4, F2FS, EROFS, HMDFS |
| MINIX | No | No | Yes | No | Yes | | | | | | | | Yes | | | | | | | |
| FreeDOS | No | No | Yes | No | No | No | No | No | No | | | | No | Yes | | | | Yes | | |
| Genode | No | No | Yes | No | Yes | No | No | No | No | No | No | No | No | Yes | No | No | No | Yes | No | Extensible VFS layer |
| Haiku | No | Yes | Yes | Yes | Yes (Note: Ext2/3 read and write support for Haiku (jvff's blog).) | Yes | | | | | | | | Yes | Yes | Yes | No (Note: The GSoC 2009 project assignment was never completed (Obaro Ogbo's blog Archived 17 June 2012 at the Wayback Machine).) | | | |
| KolibriOS | No | | Yes | Yes | Yes | Yes | Yes | | | | | | | Yes | | | | Yes | | |
| MenuetOS | No | | Yes | | | | | | | | | | | | | | | | | |
| GNU | Yes (Note: Ext3/4 is not supported on Hurd kernel for now) | | Yes | | Yes | Yes | | | Yes (Note: UFS support is dropped on Hurd kernel for now) | | | | | Yes | | Yes | | Yes | No | |
| ReactOS | No | No | Yes | | Yes | No | No | No | No | | | | No | | | | | | | |
| L4, Fiasco, Pistachio | No | | Yes | No | | | | | | | | | | | | | | | | |
| Plan 9 | No | No | Yes | | Yes | No | No | No | No | No | No | No | No | Yes | No | Yes | Yes | Yes | No | Fossil, Venti, most system services |
| AROS | No | | Yes | | | | | | | | | | | | | | | Yes | | SFS, AFFS |
| Syllable | No | Yes | Yes | Yes | Yes | Yes | | | | | | | | Yes | | | | Yes | | AFS |
| Inferno | No | No | Yes | No | No | No | No | No | No | No | No | No | No | Yes | No | No | No | Yes | | kfs, most system services |
| FreeRTOS | No | | | | | | | | | | | | | | | | | | No | |
| eCos | No | | Yes | | Yes | | | | | | | | | | | | | Yes | | MMFS, ROMfs, JFFS2, YAFFS |
| RTEMS | No | | Yes | | | | | | | | | | | | | Yes | | Yes | | TarFS, TFTP FS, IMFS, miniIMFS |
| HelenOS | No | No | Yes | No | Yes | Yes | No | No | No | No | No | No | Yes | Yes | Yes | No | No | Yes | | locfs, exFAT |
| E/OS | No | Yes (Note: Default in series 028.) | Yes | No | Yes | No | No | No | No | No | No | No | Yes | Yes | No | Yes | Yes | Yes | | |
| Name | Bcachefs | BFS | FAT16, dosfs; FAT32, vfat | NTFS | Ext2 | Ext3 | XFS | ReiserFS | UFS | UFS2 | HFS | HFS+ | MINIXfs | ISO 9660 | UDF | NFS | SMBFS | RAM disk, tmpfs | ZFS | Other special file systems |

== Supported file system features ==
| Name | RAID | quota | Resource access control | encryption | other special file system features |
|---|---|---|---|---|---|
| Linux | Yes | Yes | Unix, ACL, MAC | Yes | LVM, EVMS |
| FreeBSD | Yes | Yes | Unix, ACL, MAC | Yes | GEOM, snapshots, background fsck, user-mountable file systems |
| OpenBSD | Yes | Yes | Unix | Yes | |
| NetBSD | Yes | Yes | Unix, Veriexec | Yes | Snapshots, Journaling |
| DragonFly BSD | Yes | Yes | Unix | Yes | HAMMER, Snapshots, Checksumming, Deduplication |
| OpenSolaris, illumos | Yes | Yes | Unix, ACL, MAC | Yes | Solaris Volume Manager, ZFS, snapshots, transparent data repair |
| Darwin, OpenDarwin | | Yes | Unix, ACL | Yes | |
| OpenHarmony | No | No | RBAC | Yes | HMDFS, Access token manager |
| Oniro | No | No | RBAC | Yes | HMDFS, Access token manager |
| MINIX | | | Unix | | |
| FreeDOS | | | No | | |
| Genode | No | No | No | No | Per-process virtual file-system layer |
| KolibriOS | | | No | | |
| MenuetOS | | | No | | |
| GNU | | | Unix | | |
| ReactOS | | | No | | |
| L4, Fiasco, Pistachio | | | | | |
| Plan 9 | No | No | Unix-like, no root | No | snapshots, venti archival storage, per-process namespace, user-mountable file systems |
| AROS | | | | | |
| Syllable | | | Unix | | 64-bit, journaling, extended file attributes |
| Inferno | No | No | Unix-like, no root | No | per-process namespace, user-mountable file systems |
| FreeRTOS | | | | | |
| eCos | | | | | |
| RTEMS | | | | | |
| HelenOS | No | No | No | No | No |
| E/OS | Yes | Yes | Unix | Yes | No |
| Name | RAID | quota | Resource access control | encryption | other special file system features |

== Security features ==
| Operating system | Mandatory access control | Software executable space protection | Operating system-level virtualization | Virtualisation | Userspace protection | Others |
|---|---|---|---|---|---|---|
| Linux | SELinux, AppArmor (Note: available as a patch(not integrated into the linux kernel or the userland utilities), see the security features of the Linux distribution for more details) | Exec Shield, PaX | Chroot, namespace and cgroups, (Note: LXC is a front-end to this; also see lwn.net) Linux-VServer, OpenVZ | KVM | IPFilter, Iptables | grsecurity, RSBAC |
| FreeBSD | SeBSD, (Note: not integrated into the operating system) (Note: see here for more details) TrustedBSD | ProPolice/SSP (Note: ProPolice/Stack-Smashing Protector has been enabled in base system since FreeBSD 8.0 release.) | jail | bhyve | IPFW, PF, IPFilter | |
| Darwin | SEDarwin, TrustedBSD | | jail | | IPFW | |
| OpenBSD | | W^X, ProPolice/SSP (Note: see here for more details) | | vmm | PF | |
| OpenSolaris, illumos | TrustedBSD | | Solaris Containers | KVM | IPFilter | RBAC |
| OpenHarmony | iTrustee (TEEOS) | | Distributed Virtual Framework | device_qemu | appverify | RBAC |
| Oniro | iTrustee (TEEOS) | | Distributed Virtual Framework | device_qemu | appverify | RBAC |
| Plan 9 | No | No | per-process namespaces | | | |
| Inferno | No | No | per-process namespaces | | | |

== See also ==
- Berkeley Software Distribution
- Comparison of operating systems
- Comparison of Linux distributions
- Comparison of BSD operating systems
- Comparison of kernels
- Comparison of file systems
- Comparison of platform virtualization software
- Comparison of DOS operating systems
- List of operating systems
- Live CD
- RTEMS
- Unix
- Unix-like
