= Hobbyist operating system =

Operating system made by computer hobbyists

The development of a hobbyist operating system is one of the more involved and technical options for a computer hobbyist. The definition of a hobby operating system can sometimes be vague. It can be from the developer's view, where the developers do it just for fun or learning; it can also be seen from the user's view, where the users are only using it as a novelty; or it can be defined as an operating system which doesn't have a very big user base.

Development can begin from existing resources like a kernel, an operating system, or a bootloader, or it can also be made completely from scratch. The development platform could be a bare hardware machine, which is the nature of an operating system, but it could also be developed and tested on a virtual machine. Since the hobbyist must claim more ownership for adapting a complex system to the ever-changing needs of the technical terrain, much enthusiasm is common amongst the different groups attracted to operating system development.

== Development ==
Elements of operating system development include:

- Kernel:
  - Bootstrapping
  - Memory management
  - Process management and scheduling
  - Device driver management
  - Program API
- External programs
- User interface

The C programming language is frequently used for hobby operating system programming, as well as assembly language, though other languages, such as C++ can be used as well. For instance, SerenityOS is a notable hobby operating system written primarily in C++. Rust has been gaining in popularity in recent years as well, with one of biggest operation systems written in rust being RedoxOS.

The use of assembly language is common with small systems, especially those based on eight bit microprocessors such as the MOS Technology 6502 family or the Zilog Z80, or in systems with a lack of available resources because of its small output size and low-level efficiency.

== User interface ==
Most hobby operating systems use a command-line interface or a simple text user interface due to ease of development. More advanced hobby operating systems may have a graphical user interface. For example, AtheOS was a hobby operating system with a graphical interface written entirely by one programmer.

=== Examples ===
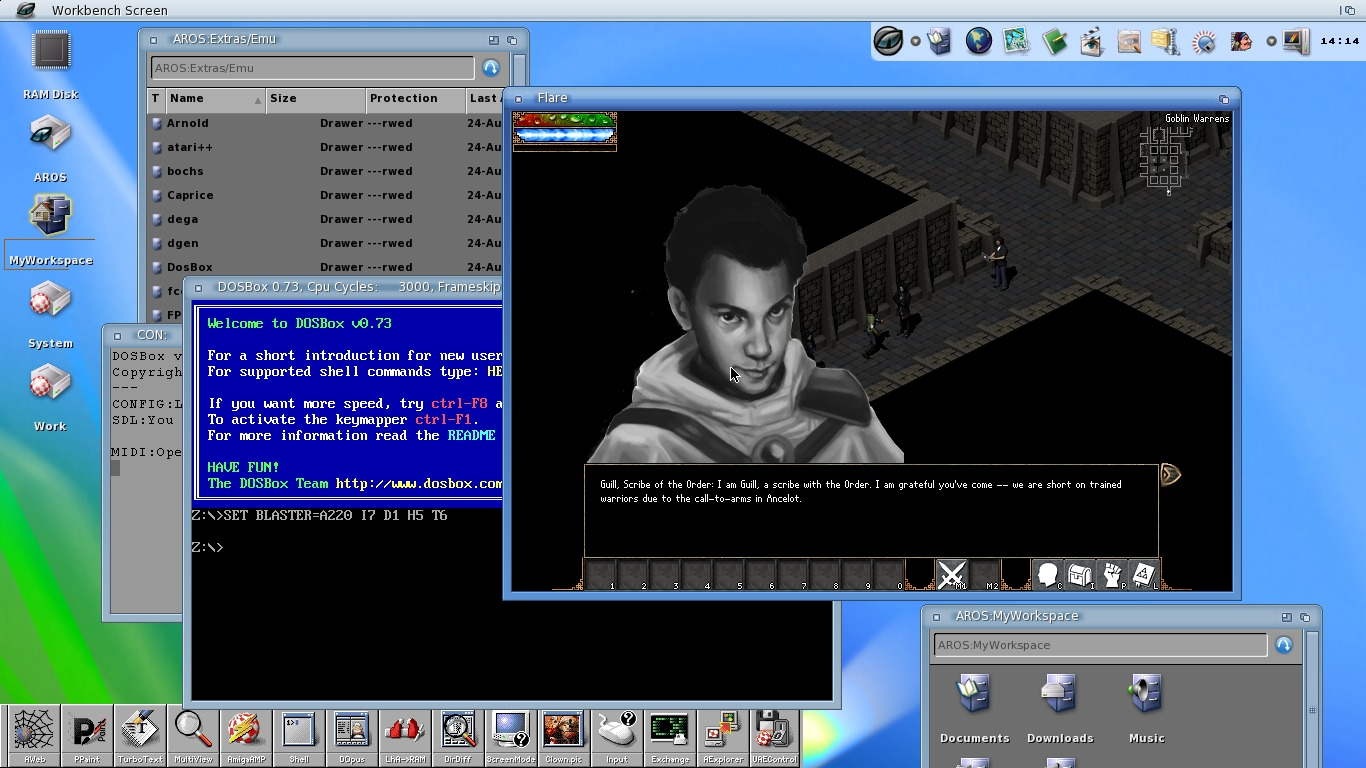
AROS

DexOS

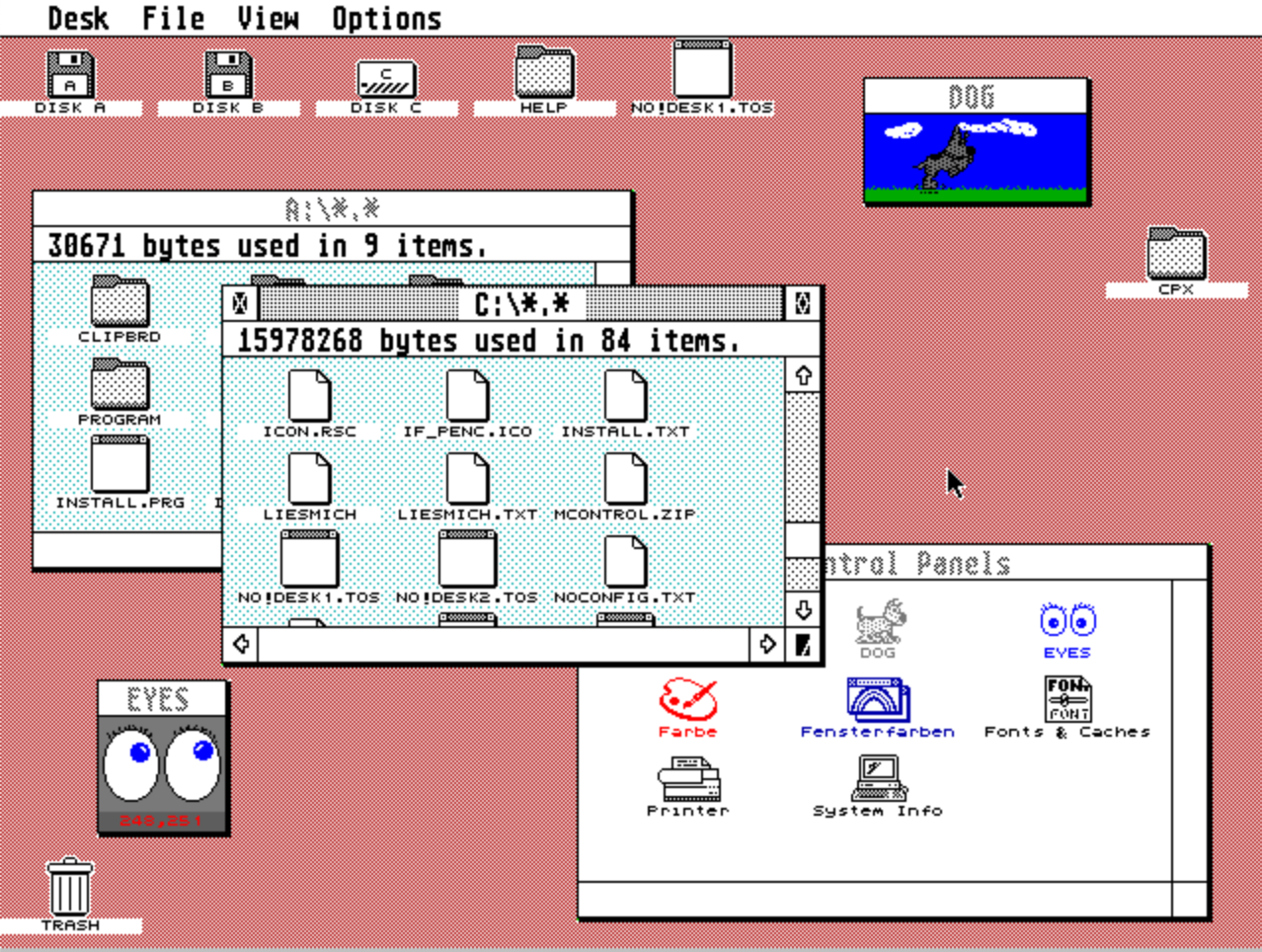
EmuTOS

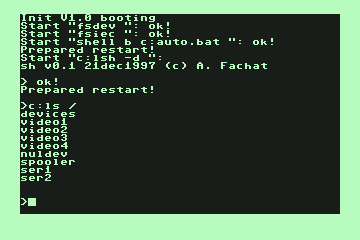
GeckOS

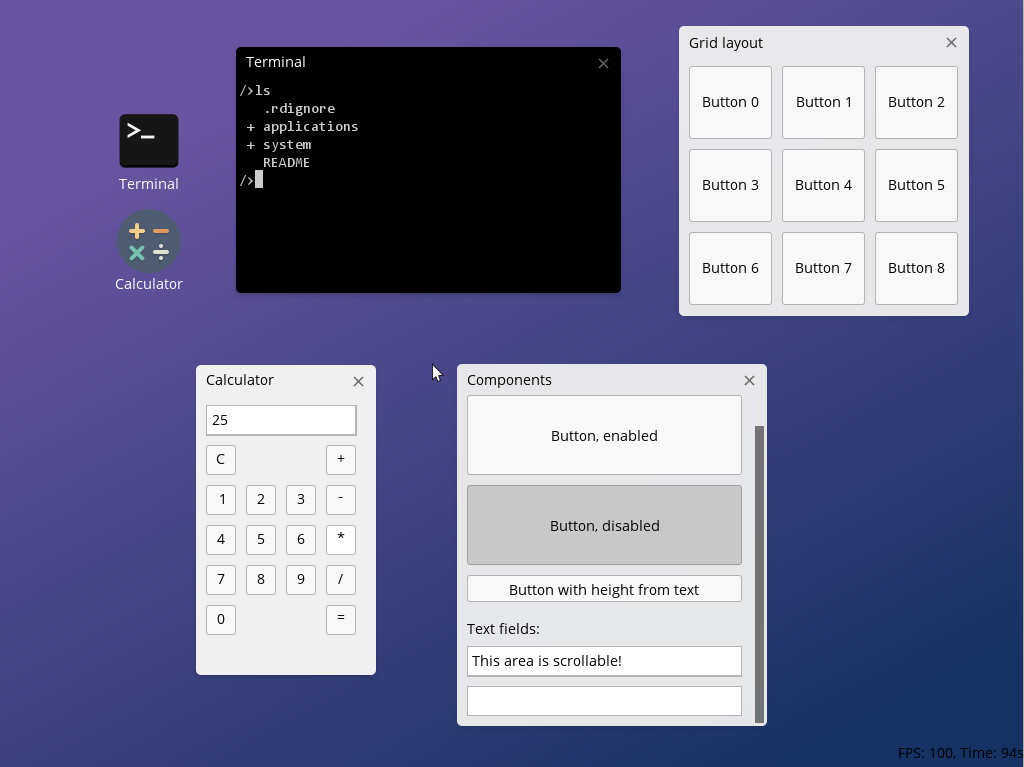
Ghost

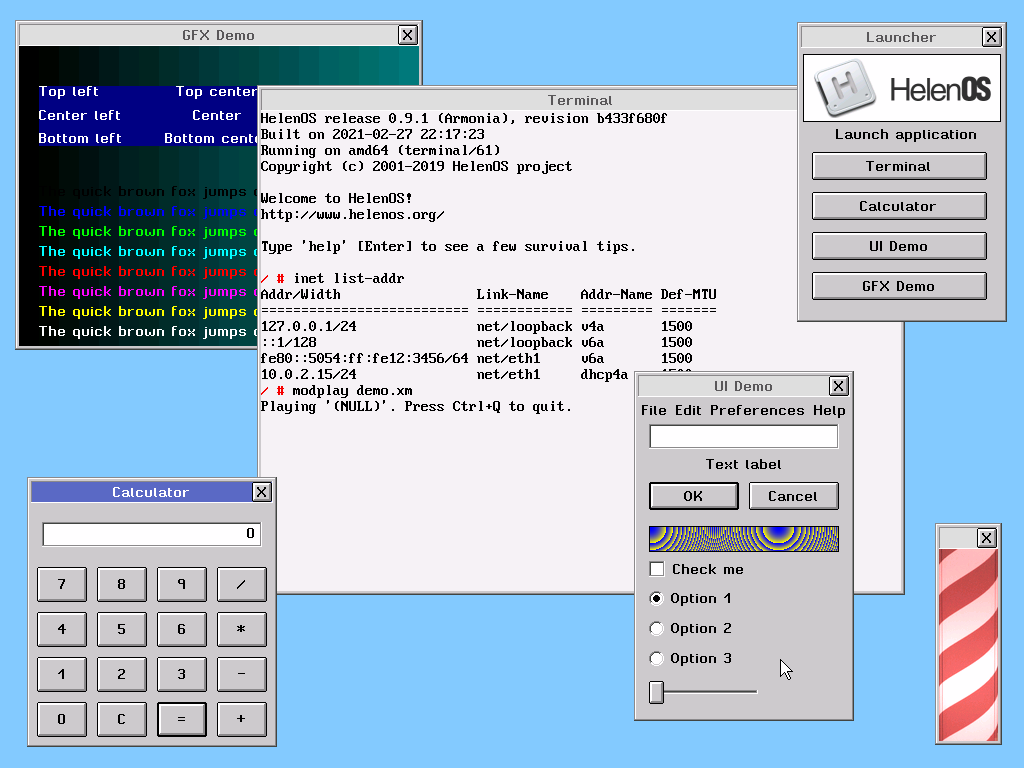
HelenOS

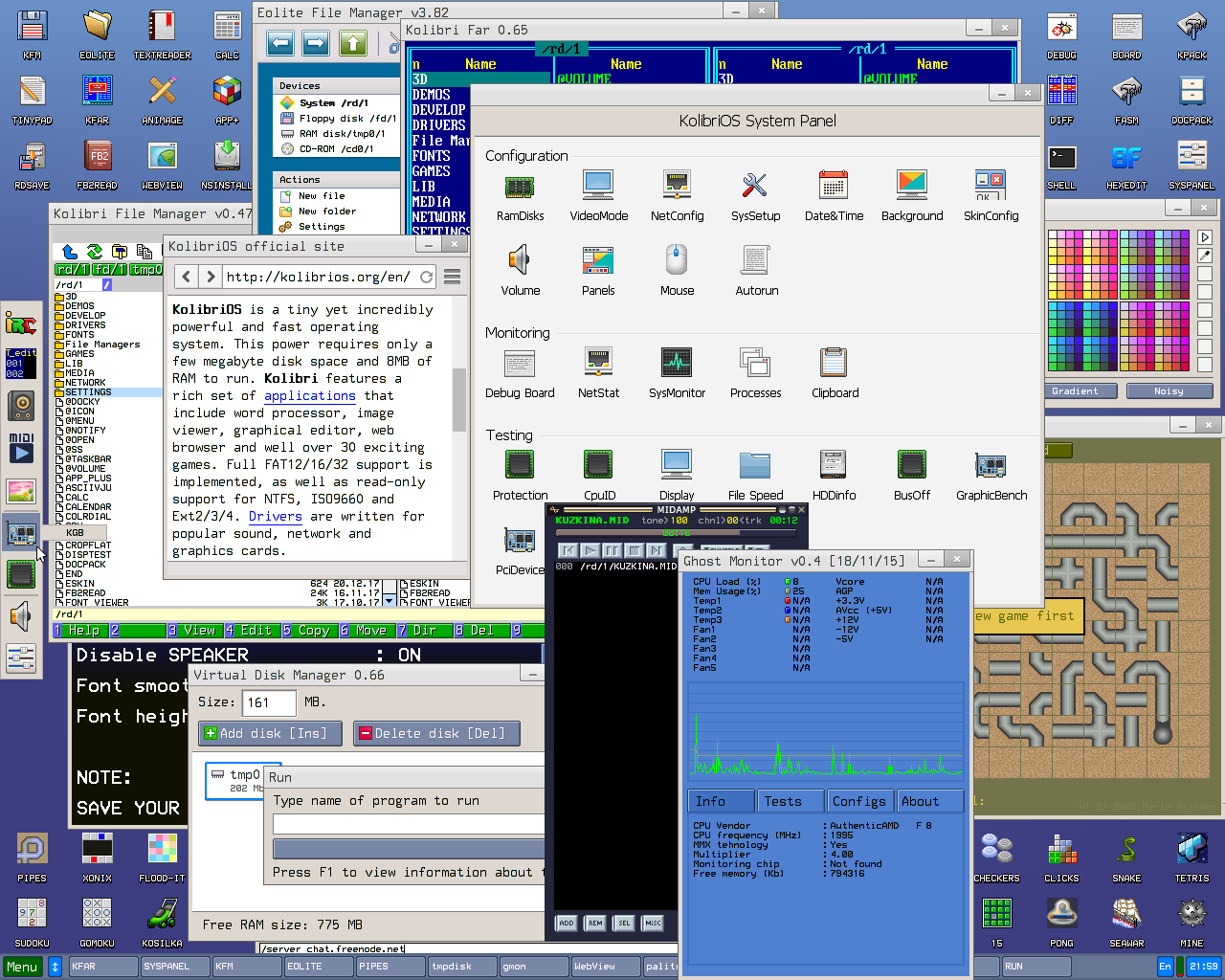
KolibriOS

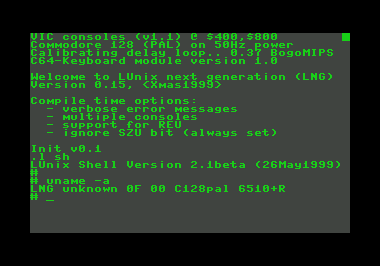
LUnix

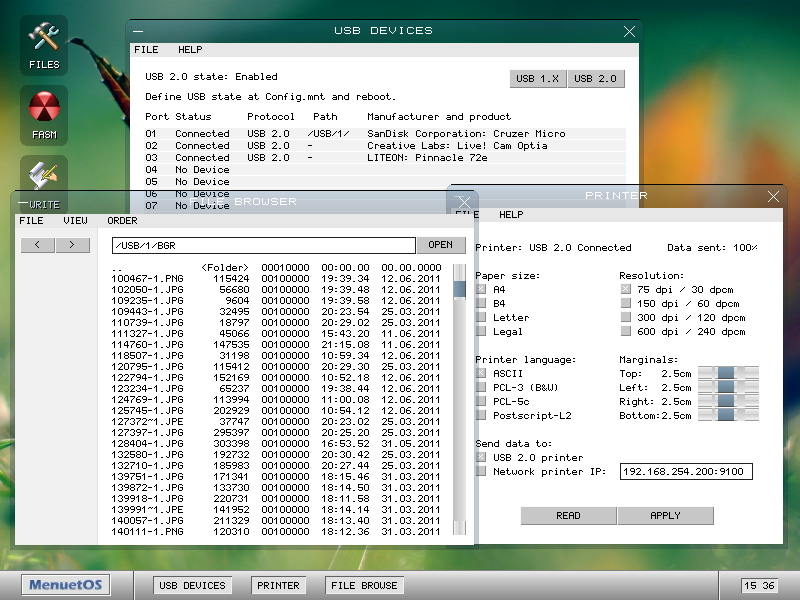
MenuetOS

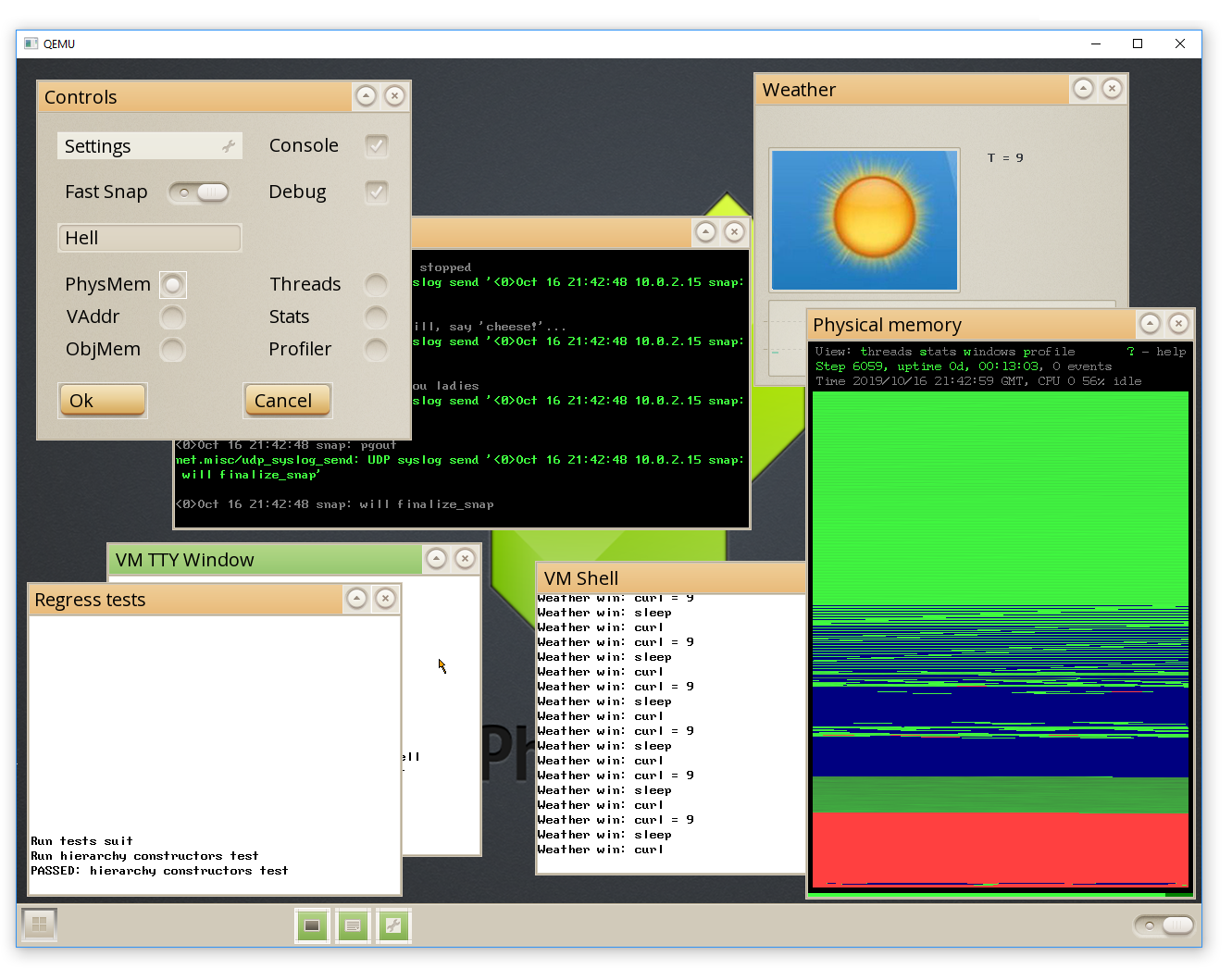
Phantom OS

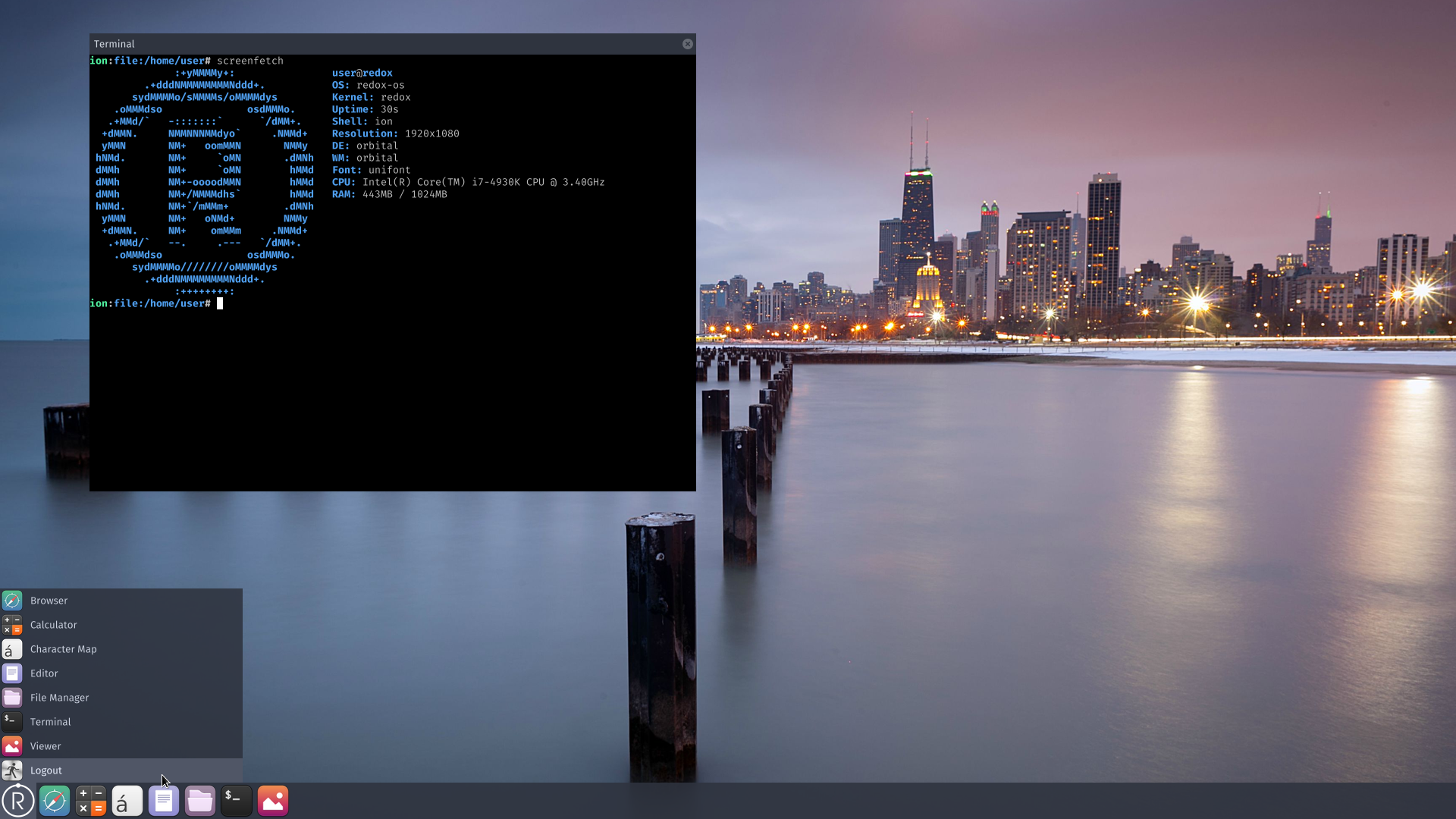
Redox

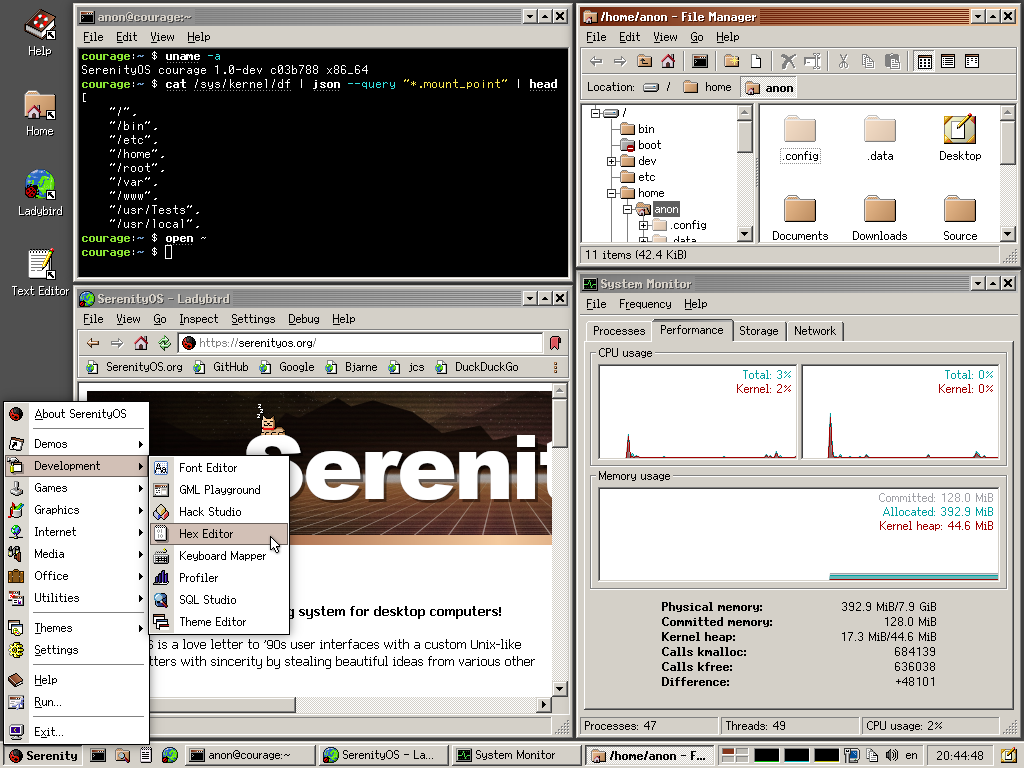
SerenityOS

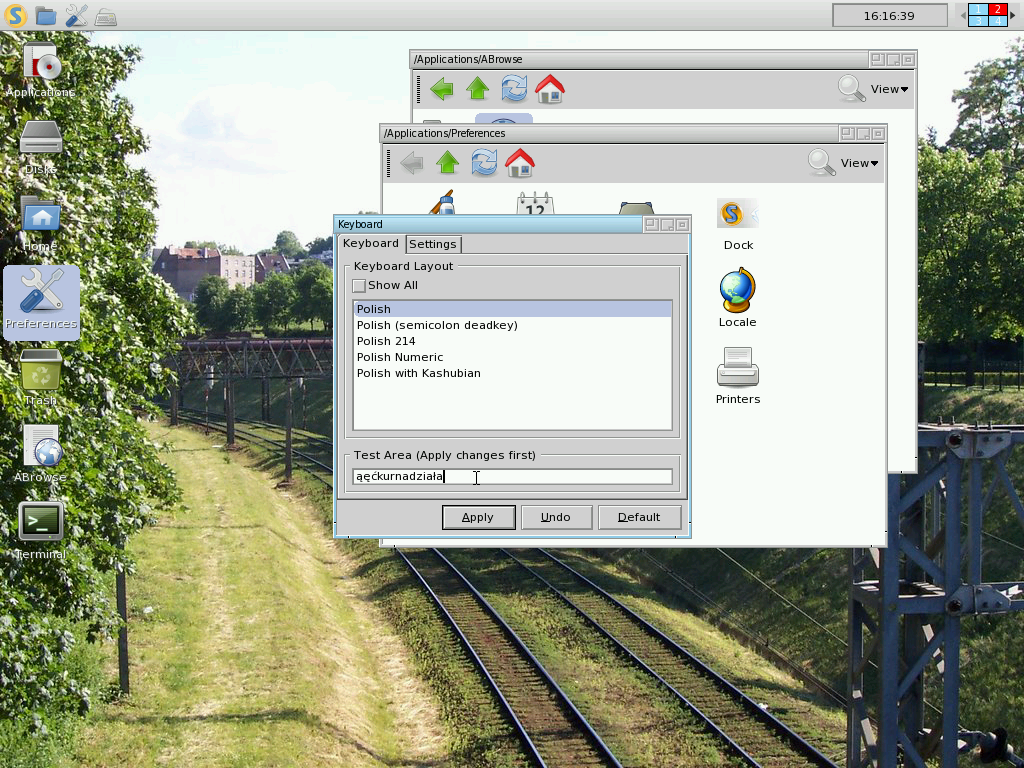
Syllable Desktop

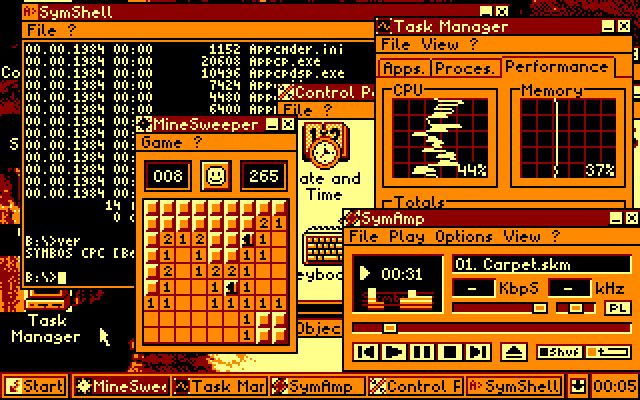
SymbOS

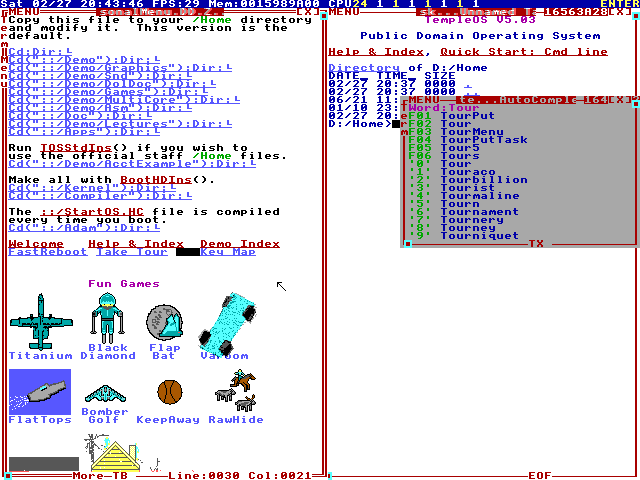
TempleOS

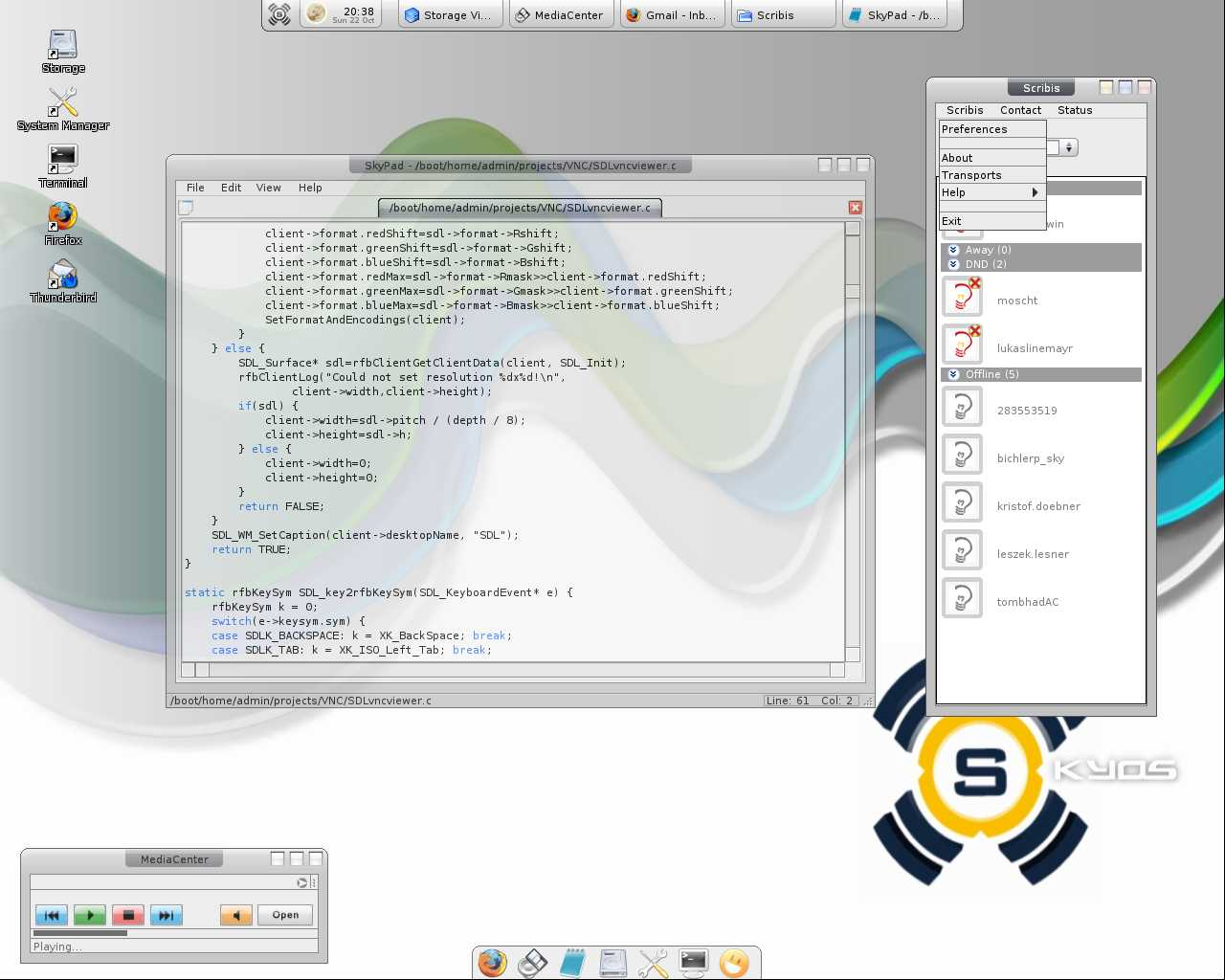
SkyOS

== See also ==
- List of hobbyist operating systems
- Computer architecture
