= SerenityOS =

Hobbyist desktop computing operating system

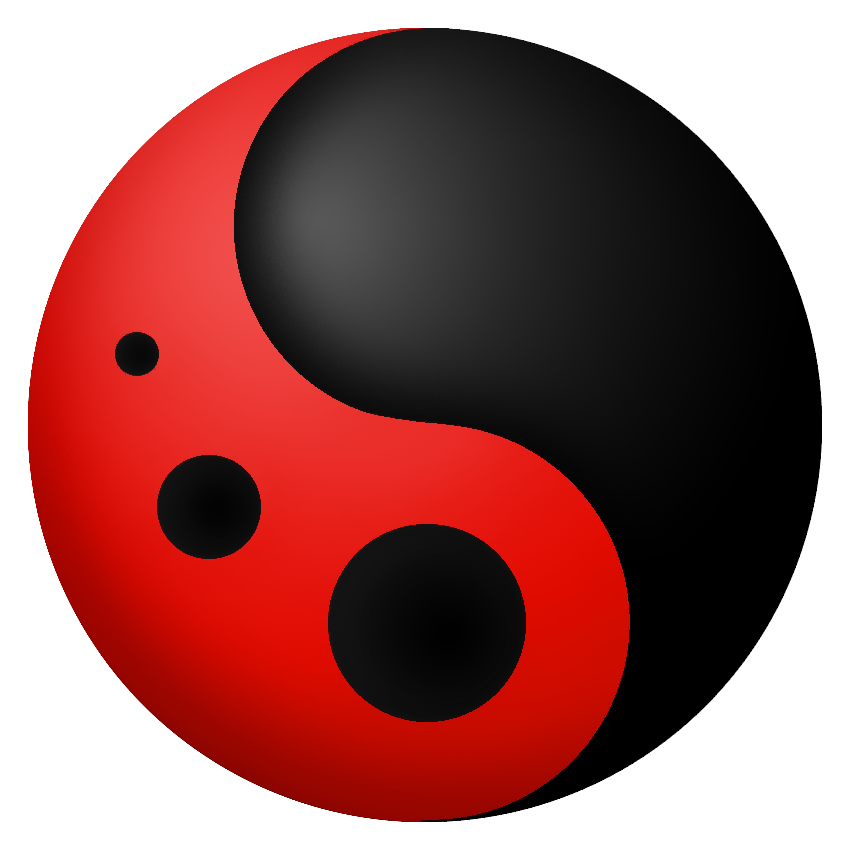

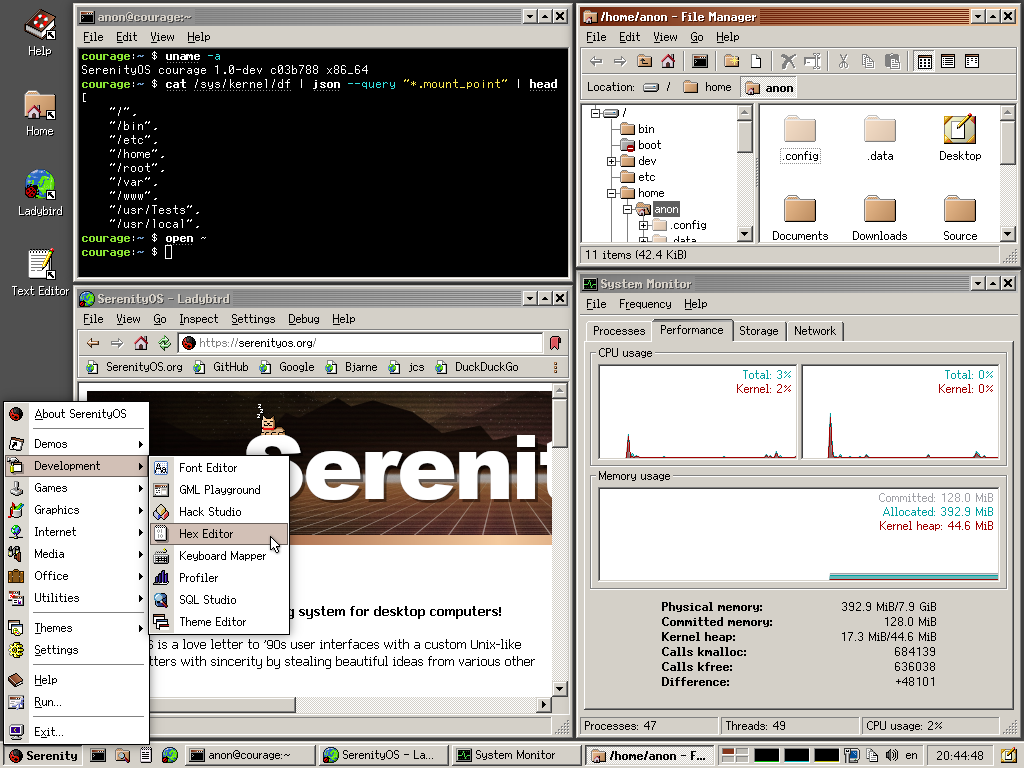
- The SerenityOS Desktop
- Developer: the SerenityOS community
- Written in: Serenity C++
- Working state: Current
- Source model: Open source
- Initial release: October 10, 2018; 7 years ago
- Repository: github.com/SerenityOS/serenity
- Available in: English
- Package manager: Ports (as part of the build system)
- Supported platforms: x86-64, ARM, RISC-V
- Kernel type: Monolithic
- Userland: POSIX
- Default user interface: GUI
- License: BSD-2-Clause
- Official website: www.serenityos.org

SerenityOS is a free and open source desktop operating system. It features a preemptive kernel, currently supports x86-64, ARM, and RISC-V based computers, and hosts multiple complex applications including its own web browser and integrated development environment (IDE).

SerenityOS began development in 2018 as a solo project by Swedish programmer Andreas Kling. It is maintained by a community of hobbyists on GitHub where it is described as "a love letter to '90s user interfaces with a custom Unix-like core" that "does not cater to non-technical users".

== History ==
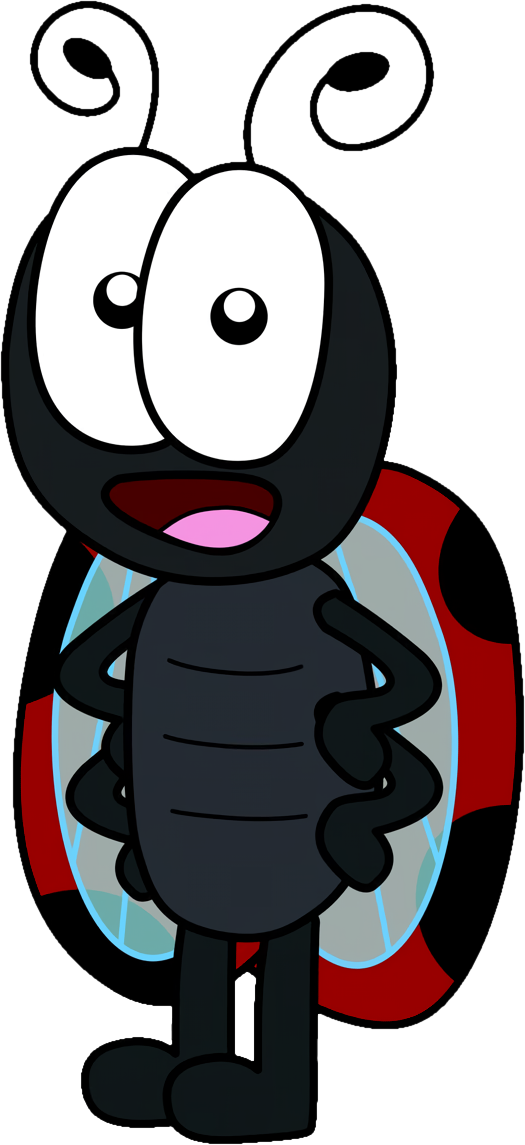
Buggie, the SerenityOS mascot

Andreas Kling previously worked at Nokia and later at Apple on the WebKit team. He began developing the project in part to aid his recovery from addiction, and as such the name of the project derives from the Serenity Prayer. Starting in 2021, Kling began working full-time on SerenityOS, supported by community donations.

On June 3rd, 2024, Andreas Kling stepped down as a project lead from the project, while keeping his role as a maintainer, to work on the Ladybird browser. Three months later, on October 4th, 2024, he removed himself from a maintainer list in the SerenityOS repository, and updated his mail mapping alias to ladybird.org in the forked Ladybird repository marking the end of his involvement.

== Features and development ==
SerenityOS aims to be a modern Unix-like operating system, with a look and feel that emulates 1990s operating systems such as Microsoft Windows and Mac OS. Incorporating third-party code into the system is discouraged. The web browser, for instance, does not use a pre-existing web engine such as WebKit, instead using its own Browser (built on LibWeb engine). There is a collection of ported software, such as GCC, Git and Doom, with varying levels of functionality.

Development does not adhere to a release cycle; as such, there are no releases. Additionally, no binary distributions are provided and prospects are expected to build the system from source. The system is written in what the authors call "Serenity C++", a C++ coding style that avoids exceptions and features its own standard library.

The relative popularity of SerenityOS compared to other hobbyist systems is in part due to the modest success of Kling's YouTube channel, where he uploaded videos of himself developing parts of the system alongside demos and monthly progress updates (until April 2024, where the last update was hosted by Andrew Kaster, the project’s core developer).

Work is currently at the early stages to support AArch64 and RISC-V based processors.

=== Web browser ===
SerenityOS includes a version of the Ladybird web browser, built from the ground up using its internal libraries LibWeb, LibJS and LibWasm. Andreas Kling develops it alongside paid and volunteer contributors. On June 3, 2024, Kling announced his plans to fork Ladybird and begin development on the browser as a separate project. On July 1, 2024, in collaboration with Chris Wanstrath, Kling announced the founding of the Ladybird Browser Initiative, a 501(c)(3) nonprofit to support the development of the browser.

As of July 2024, development of Ladybird mostly occurs in its own repository, with changes sometimes being synced to the SerenityOS version.

== Reception ==
Jim Salter of Ars Technica regarded the use of the ext2 file system as his least favorite feature of the operating system. Compared to TempleOS (another operating system well known in the hobbyist community), he considered SerenityOS more accessible. For less technical users that are looking for a mid-to-late-90s reminiscent visual style, the Xfce Chicago95 theme as well as the Redmond Project have been recommended instead.
