= Syllable Desktop =

Operating system

Syllable
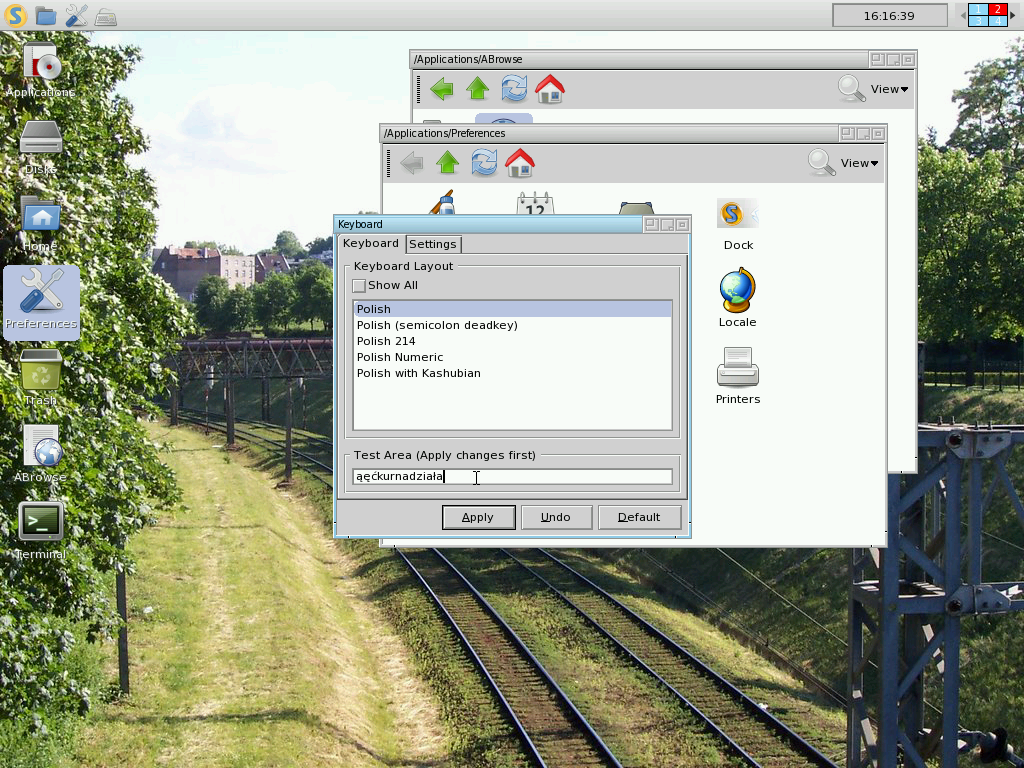
- Syllable 0.6.5
- Developer: Kristian Van Der Vliet, Kaj de Vos, Rick Caudill, Arno Klenke, Henrik Isaksson
- OS family: Unix-like
- Working state: Alpha
- Source model: Open source
- Initial release: 0.4.0 / July 2002; 24 years ago
- Latest release: 0.6.7 / April 12, 2012; 14 years ago
- Supported platforms: IA-32
- Kernel type: Hybrid
- License: GNU General Public License
- Official website: syllable.metaproject.frl

Syllable Desktop is a discontinued free and open-source lightweight hobbyist operating system for Pentium and compatible processors. Its purpose was to create an easy-to-use desktop operating system for the home and small office user. Its development began in 2002 as a fork of AtheOS.

The same group produced Syllable Server, for server computers, based on Linux core.

== History ==
Syllable Desktop is a fork of AtheOS, a free and open source operating system that was discontinued. AtheOS was originally developed to be an Amiga clone for x86 processors, and also took inspiration from BeOS for the file system it used. Syllable was started around July 2002 because the sole developer of AtheOS went inactive for nine months. Syllable Desktop aimed to be a successor to AtheOS and expand on it, such as adding additional hardware support. Further development aimed at porting additional software and libraries. The last source code commit was in 2012, but the developer is working on restarting the project according to information on the website.

== Features ==
Syllable Desktop has a native Webkit-based web browser named Webster (formerly ABrowse), an email client named Whisper, a media player, an IDE, and other applications.

Features according to the official website include:

- Native 64-bit journaled file system, the AtheOS File System (AFS)
- C++ oriented API
- Object-oriented graphical desktop environment on a native GUI architecture
- Mostly POSIX compliant
- Software ports, including Vim, Perl, Python, Apache, others.
- GNU toolchain (GCC, Glibc, Binutils, Make)
- Preemptive multitasking with multithreading
- Symmetric multiprocessing (multiple processor) support
- Device drivers for most common hardware (video, sound, network chips)
- File system drivers for FAT (read/write), NTFS (read), and ext2 (read)
- Rebol as system scripting language

== Reception ==
OSNews gave a positive review of Syllable, calling it "astoundingly complete for a hobbyist OS at version 0.5" and praising the speed of the OS, but noting that some features and subsystems were not yet implemented, the limited range of apps, and the occasional stability issues. Linux.com noted similar points in their review. pro-linux.de stated that Syllable was a promising upcoming operating system. A review by Root.cz was negative, stating that "for now, Syllable is just one of the less successful alternatives to Linux or *BSD."

== See also ==
- Haiku (operating system)
- TSWM (window manager)
