= MenuetOS =

Operating system

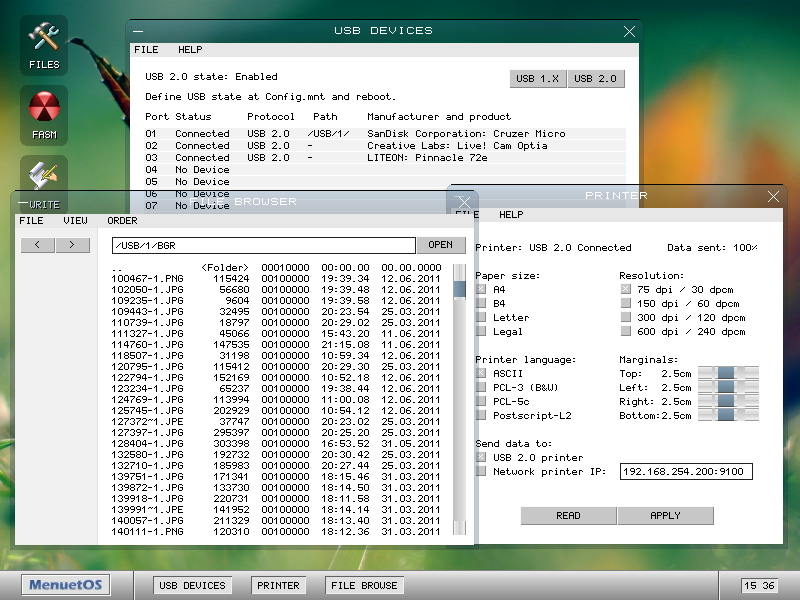
- Screenshot
- Developer: Ville M. Turjanmaa
- Written in: FASM assembly language
- Working state: Beta
- Source model: Open source (32-bit); Closed source (64-bit)
- Initial release: May 16, 2000; 26 years ago (32-bit)
- Latest release: 32-bit: 0.86B / September 2, 2019; 64-bit: 1.64.00 / November 20, 2026
- Available in: English, Russian, Chinese, Czech, Serbian
- Supported platforms: IA-32, x86-64
- Kernel type: Monolithic
- Default user interface: Graphical user interface by Yamen Nasr
- License: 32-bit: GPL-2.0-only; 64-bit: Proprietary
- Official website: www.menuetos.net

MenuetOS is an operating system with a monolithic preemptive, real-time kernel written in FASM assembly language. The system also includes video drivers. It runs on 64-bit and 32-bit x86 architecture computers. Its author is Ville M. Turjanmaa. It has a graphical desktop, games, and networking abilities (TCP/IP stack). One distinctive feature is that it fits on one 1.44 MB floppy disk.

== History ==
=== 32-bit ===
MenuetOS was originally written for 32-bit x86 architectures and released under the GPL-2.0-only license, thus many of its applications are distributed under the GPL.

=== 64-bit ===
The 64-bit MenuetOS, often referred to as Menuet 64, remains a platform for learning 64-bit assembly language programming. The 64-bit Menuet is distributed without charge for personal and educational use only, but without the source code, and the license includes a clause that prohibits disassembly.

Multi-core support was added on 24 Feb 2010.

== Features ==
MenuetOS development has focused on fast, simple, efficient implementation. MenuetOS has networking abilities, and a working TCP/IP stack. Most of the networking code is written by Mike Hibbett.

The main focus of Menuet has been on making an environment for easy assembly programming, but it is still possible to run software written in high-level programming languages on the assembler core. The biggest single effort towards high-level language support is Jarek Pelczar's work in porting C libraries to Menuet.

The GUI at version 0.99 supports display resolutions up to 1920 x 1080 (16 million colors) with window transparency. The OS has support for several classes of USB 2.0 peripherals. MenuetOS ships with the shareware versions of Quake and Doom.

For disk access, MenuetOS supports the FAT32 file system. Write support is only possible to USB connected devices.

As of version 1.49.60, MenuetOS can be booted on UEFI machines as well using Easyboot.

== Distributions ==
=== 32-bit ===
- Menuet32
- GridWorks "EZ" distribution (comprehensive 32-bit archive packages) (CD/HD Boots)

=== 64-bit ===
The 64-bit main distribution is now proprietary. Several distributions of the 32-bit GPL MenuetOS still exist, including translations in Russian, Chinese, Czech, and Serbian.

- Menuet64

== See also ==
- KolibriOS - A free fork of MenuetOS 32-bit

== Bibliography ==
- (in German) MenuetOS - 32bit-Betriebssystem auf einer Floppy, Der Standard, 12 May 2003
- Eugenia Loli-Queru (5 Sep 2001) Interview With Ville Turjanmaa, the Creator of MenuetOS, OSNews
- Ville M. Turjanmaa (December 1, 2001) The Menuet Operating System. Packing a lot of punch into a small package, Dr. Dobb's
