= KolibriOS =

Operating system

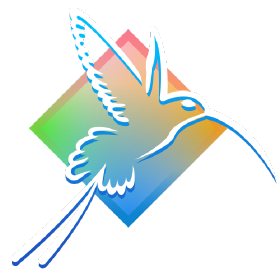

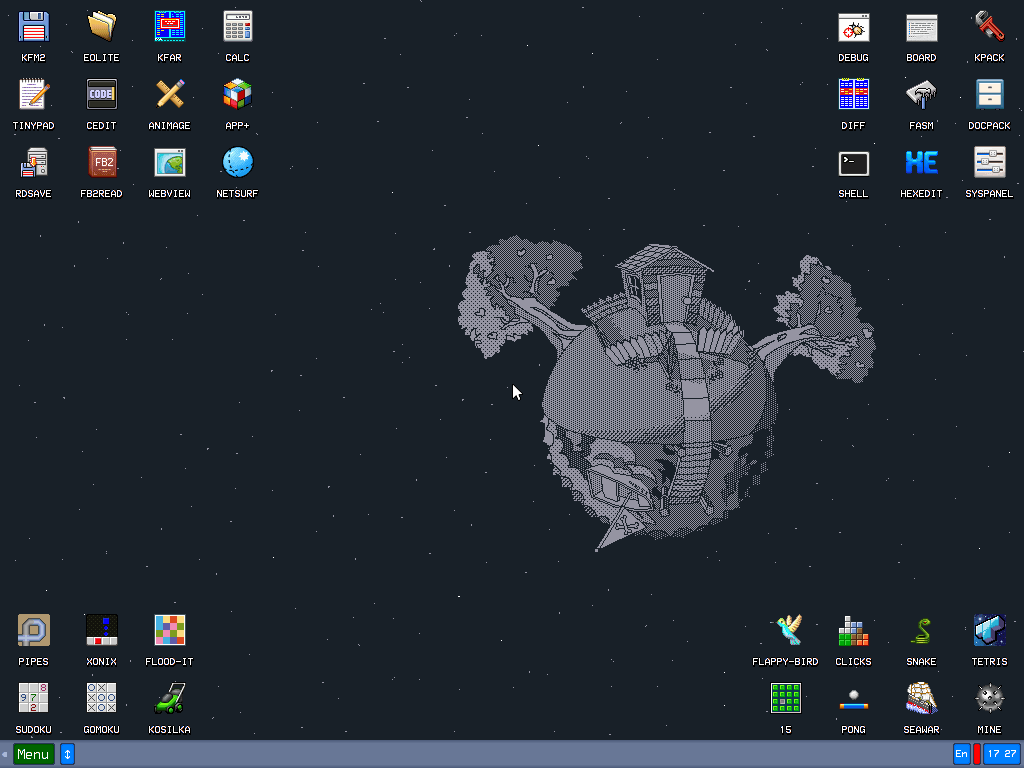
- Developer: KolibriOS Project Team
- Written in: FASM
- Working state: Active
- Source model: Open source
- Initial release: 2004
- Latest release: 0.7.7.0-9171 / August 23, 2026; 2 months ago
- Repository: git.kolibrios.org
- Available in: English, Russian, Spanish
- Supported platforms: x86
- Kernel type: Monolithic
- Default user interface: KolibriOS Kernel API
- License: GPL-2.0-only with binary blobs
- Preceded by: MenuetOS
- Official website: www.kolibrios.org

KolibriOS is an open-source operating system for x86 computers, written completely in FASM assembly language. It has been developed since 2004, forked from MenuetOS, and supports i586 CPUs or newer. KolibriOS is small sized and fits on a single 3.5" floppy disk; despite this, it features a full graphical user interface, preemptive multitasking, networking capabilities, and many pieces of bundled software.

The name "Kolibri" is the Slavic spelling of the word of Caribbean origin for hummingbird and symbolizes the operating system's tiny size and fast speed.

== Development ==
KolibriOS was forked from MenuetOS, a similar operating system that was built in 32-bit and 64-bit editions. It attracted much popularity in Russia and a number of other countries in the region, leading to a community contributing to the project. The first version of KolibriOS, meant to be a driver fix for the Russian-language distribution, was released by Marat Zakiyanov "mario79" in 2004. Shortly after the start of the KolibriOS project, MenuetOS's developer decided to only focus on the 64-bit version, which unlike its 32-bit counterpart was closed source. KolibriOS on the other hand has only been developed in 32-bit and remains open source.

KolibriOS has been developed by a number of contributors from different countries including Russia, Kazakhstan, Ukraine, Belarus, Uzbekistan, Moldova, Estonia, Germany and Belgium. Distribution assembly is handled by Evgeny Grechnikov or "Diamond".

There are two development branches: KolibriACPI, which has extended ACPI support, and Kolibri-A, an exokernel version of KolibriOS optimized for embedded applications and hardware engineering; only few AMD APU-based platforms are currently supported.

== Features ==
Due to its small size (most distributions will fit on a single 1.44 MB floppy disk image) and being written in assembly, the OS boots in only a few seconds on various devices. It has support for booting from NTFS, Ext2/3/4, FAT12/16/32, exFAT, and ISO9660 based disks and can also boot from Coreboot and Windows.

KolibriOS has a graphical user interface based on, and optimised for VESA. It features pre-emptive multitasking, streams, and parallel execution of system calls. It has built-in application software (with more than 250 packages) such as a word processor, image viewer, music player, and web browser, as well as a code editor with an integrated macro assembler (FASM). KolibriOS features a shell supporting various common commands used on Unix-like systems.

== Supported hardware ==
USB 1.1 and 2.0 are supported (UHCI, OHCI and EHCI). There is also support for USB hubs, although the only USB HID devices supported include keyboard, mouse and USB flash drives. Internal hard disks with PATA/IDE and SATA/AHCI interfaces are supported natively. Supported file systems include FAT12, FAT16, FAT32, ext2, ext3 and ext4 (partially), NTFS (no extended functions such as encryption), read-only exFAT, XFS, CDFS (including multisession).

KolibriOS supports the full TCP/IP stack and certain Ethernet network cards. Intel High Definition Audio is supported on certain motherboards while AC'97 codec support exists for various chipsets including: Intel, nForce, nForce2, nForce3, nForce4, SIS7012, FM801, VT8233, VT8233C, VT8235, VT8237, VT8237R, VT8237R Plus and EMU10K1X. Video is claimed to work on any card and drivers are available for specific Intel or AMD cards.

System requirements are:

- i586-compatible CPU (with slight changes can run on i486 machine)
- 12 MB of RAM
- VESA-compatible graphics card
- 1.44 MB 3.5" floppy drive, hard disk drive, USB flash drive or CD-ROM drive
- Keyboard and mouse (COM, PS/2 or USB)

== Reception ==
In a 2009 review piece on alternative operating systems, TechRadar called it "tremendously impressive", noting its performance and streamlined codebase.

Dedoimedo.com reviewed KolibriOS in 2012:

I allocated a more than sufficient 64MB of RAM to KolibriOS and let it fly. Now, to really show you how fast this thing is, I recorded a boot session. It shows the simple KolibriOS boot menu. Next, I press the Enter key. Soon thereafter, we are inside a fully functional desktop. How soon? Well, you can enjoy the video embedded below or follow the Youtube link if you hate embedded stuff. Now, keep your eyes on the screen, as the video is rather short. I mean, really, really short.

Jesse Smith from DistroWatch Weekly wrote the following review about KolibriOS in 2009:

The application menu is broken down into familiar groupings, such as Development, Games, Data Processing, Network and Help. There are also demo programs showing off various graphics and screensavers. Programs are easy to find and most applications work well. The help documentation is a bit scattered, as it covers a number of different topics, but there doesn't seem to be a pattern to what is explained and what isn't. In short, finding help is hit or miss, but what is explained is done so clearly.

In 2024, Simon Batt of XDA Developers wrote that KolibriOS is "charming" and that it is "perfect" for giving new life to older PCs.
